= Victorian Bar =

Bar association for the Australian state of Victoria

The Victorian Bar is the bar association of the Australian State of Victoria. The 2025–2026 President of the Bar is Fiona Ryan SC. Its members are barristers registered to practice in Victoria. Those who have been admitted to practice by the Supreme Court of Victoria are eligible to join the Victorian Bar after sitting an entrance exam and completing a Bar Readers' course. The Victorian Bar is affiliated with the Australian Bar Association and is a member of the Law Council of Australia.

The first association of barristers in Victoria was formed in 1884, although the first barristers admitted to practice in Victoria were appointed in 1841. On 20 June 1900, an official bar council was established and a Bar Roll was started. By 1902, all barristers practicing in Melbourne had signed the Roll. To this day, new barristers sign the roll when they are admitted to the Bar.

As of October 2023, 34% of barristers at the Victorian Bar were women, up from 5% in 1980. In 2023, 13% of members were born outside Australia and 6% speak languages other than English at home. Ten women have served as chairs or presidents of the Bar, including Susan Crennan AC KC, Kate McMillan SC (now the Honourable Justice McMillian), Melanie Sloss SC (now the Honourable Justice Sloss), Fiona McLeod AO SC, Jennifer Batrouney KC, Wendy Harris KC, Róisín Annesley KC, Georgina Schoff KC, Elizabeth Bennett SC (now the Honourable Justice Bennett) and Fiona Ryan SC.

== Pro bono scheme ==
In 2000, the Victorian Bar launched a legal assistance scheme in association with the Public Interest Law Clearing House, to coordinate pro bono work among barristers in Victoria. The Legal Assistance Scheme, now operating as the "Pro Bono Scheme" (the Scheme) and PILCH, now operating as "Justice Connect", has approximately 1000 participants from the Victorian Bar.

Overseen by the Pro Bono Committee, the Scheme assists individuals and community groups with legal aid. This work includes advocating for human rights, environmental or social justice causes, and helping people who are marginalised or from disadvantaged backgrounds. The premise of the Scheme is to ensure that everyone has access to legal representation regardless of age, gender, race, disability or socio-economic hardship.

== Equitable Briefing ==
In 2016, the Victorian Bar endorsed the National Model Gender Equitable Briefing Policy, launched by the Law Council of Australia to achieve a nationally consistent approach towards bringing about cultural and attitudinal change within the legal profession concerning gender briefing practices. The Victorian Bar has also adopted the Law Council's Diversity and Equality Charter. The Commercial Bar Association of Victoria, members of the Judiciary and the Victorian Equal Opportunity and Human Rights Commission have also launched the CommBar Equitable Briefing Initiative to increase briefing of women at all levels and to engage with the law firms that brief the Commercial Bar to commit to real change.

=== International legal practitioners ===
All lawyers in Australia must first be admitted to practice. In Victoria, the process for admission is conducted by the Victorian Legal Board of Admissions (VLAB).

== Chairman and presidents of the Victorian Bar ==
1900 John B Box
1900–1903 James L Purves KC
1903–1905 John B Box
1903–1905 Henry B Higgins KC
1906–1913 Frank G Duffy KC
1913–1915 Theyre A'B Weigall KC
1915–1916 Edward F Mitchell KC
1916–1917 William H Irvine KC
1917–1918 Edward F Mitchell
1918–1920 William G S McArthur KC
1920–1922 Edward F Mitchell KC
1922–1923 Herbert W Bryant KC
1923–1924 Edward F Mitchell KC
1924–1925 John G Latham
1925–1927 Edward F Mitchell KC
1927–1929 Owen Dixon KC
1929–1930 Edward F Mitchell KC
1930–1932 Wilbur L Ham KC
1932–1933 Sir Robert Gordon Menzies KT, AK, CH, QC, FAA, FRS
1933–1934 Wilbur L Ham KC
1934–1935 Harry Walker
1935–1936 John G Latham KC
1936–1937 Wilfred K Fullagar KC
1937–1938 Wilbur L Ham KC
1938–1939 Clifden H A Eager KC
1939–1946 Wilbur L Ham KC
1946–1952 Edward R T Reynolds KC
1952–1953 James B Tait QC
1953–1956 Maurice Ashkanasy QC
1956–1958 Richard M Eggleston QC
1958–1959 Douglas I Menzies QC
1959–1961 Oliver J Gillard QC
1961–1962 Reginald A Smithers QC
1962–1964 Murray V McInerney QC
1964–1966 George H Lush QC
1966–1967 Kevin V Anderson QC
1967–1969 Xavier Connor QC
1969–1971 Peter A Coldham QC
1971–1972 William Kaye QC
1972–1973 William O Harris QC
1973–1975 Richard E McGarvie QC
1975–1976 Leo S Lazarus QC
1976–1977 Kenneth H Marks QC
1977–1979 Frank X Costigan QC
1979–1981 Hartog C Berkeley QC
1981–1983 Brian Shaw SC
1983–1985 Stephen P Charles QC
1985–1986 Alex Chernov QC
1986–1987 Philip D Cummins QC
1987–1988 Charles Francis QC
1988–1990 Eugene W Gillard QC
1990–1991 David L Harper QC
1991–1992 Andrew J Kirkham QC
1992–1993 Christopher N Jessup QC
1993–1994 Susan Crennan QC
1994–1995 David J Habersberger QC
1995–1997 John E Middleton QC
1997–1998 Neil J Young QC
1998–2000 David E Curtain QC
2000–2001 D Mark B Derham QC
2001–2002 Robert Redlich QC
2002–2003 John T Rush QC
2003–2004 Robin A Brett QC
2004–2005 W Ross Ray QC
2005–2006 Kate McMillan SC
2006–2007 Michael W Shand QC
2007–2008 Peter J Riordan SC
2008–2009 G John Digby QC
2009–2010 Michael J Colbran QC
2010–2011 Mark K Moshinsky SC
2011–2012 Melanie Sloss SC
2012–2013 Fiona M McLeod AO, SC
2013–2014 E William Alstergren QC
2014–2015 James W S Peters QC
2015–2016 Paul E Anastassiou QC
2016–2017 Jennifer J Batrouney QC
2017–2019 Matthew J Collins QC
2019–2020 Wendy A Harris QC
2020–2021 Christopher Blanden QC
2021–2022 Róisín N Annesley KC
2022–2023 Sam Hay KC
2023–2024 Georgina Schoff KC
2024 Elizabeth Bennett SC
2024–2025 Justin Hannebery KC
2025–2026 Fiona Ryan SC

== See also ==
- Bar council
- Bar association
- Australian Bar Association
