= Geoffrey Digby =

Geoffrey Digby may refer to:

- Geoffrey John Digby, Australian lawyer and judge
- Geoffrey Digby, character in The Baby and the Battleship
