= Alex Rose (labor leader) =

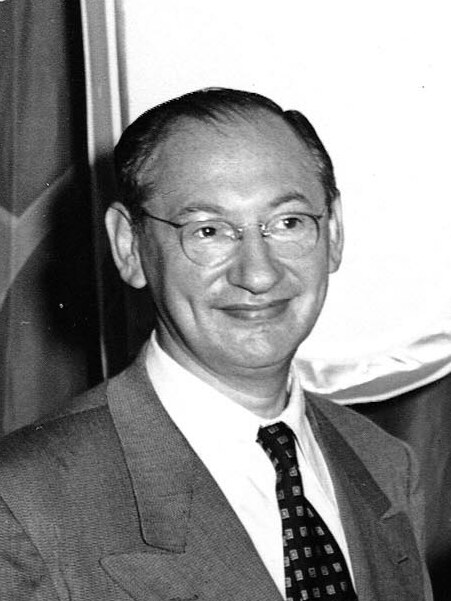
- Rose c. 1950s

President of the United Hatters, Cap and Millinery Workers International Union
- In office May 1, 1950 – December 28, 1976
- Preceded by: Max Zaritsky
- Succeeded by: Nicholas Gyory

New York State Secretary of the American Labor Party
- In office July 16, 1936 – May 20, 1944
- Preceded by: Position established
- Succeeded by: Hyman Blumberg

Personal details
- Born: October 15, 1898 Warsaw, Congress Poland, Russian Empire
- Died: December 28, 1976 (aged 78) New York City, New York, U.S.
- Party: American Labor (1936–1944); Liberal (after 1944)

Alex Rose (15 October 1898 – 28 December 1976) was a labor leader in the United Hatters of North America (UHNA) and the United Hatters, Cap and Millinery Workers International Union (UHCMW), a co-founder of the American Labor Party, and vice-chairman of the Liberal Party of New York.

== Background ==
Alex Rose, the son of a wealthy leather tanner, was born in Warsaw, Poland. After secondary school, Rose immigrated to the United States, having been denied a Polish university education because he was Jewish.

== Career ==
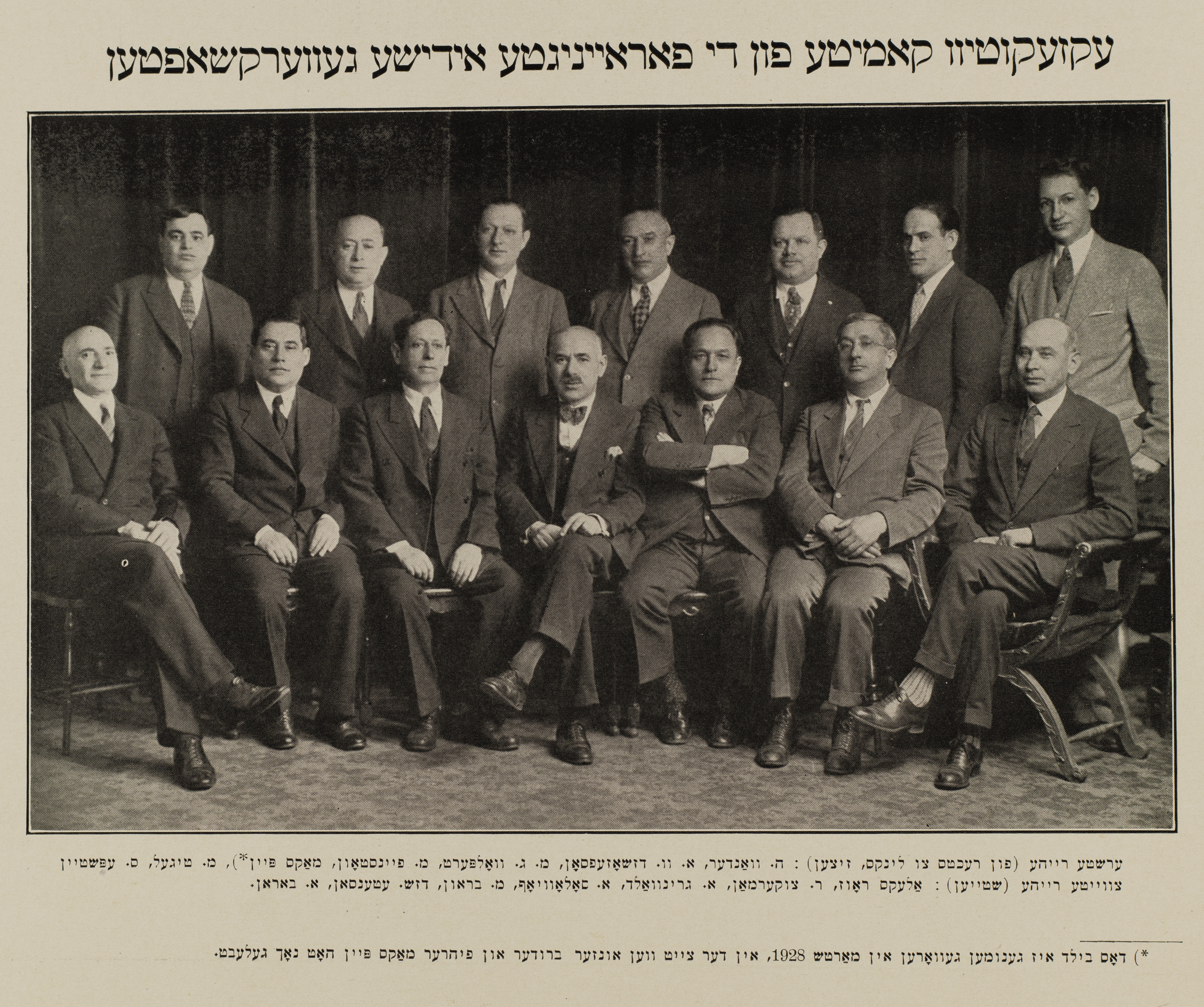
Executive Committee of the United Hebrew Trades, 1928. Seated from left to right: Samuel Epstein, M. Tigel, Max Pine, Morris Feinstone, M. Wolpert, A. Josephson, H. Wander. Standing from left to right: A. Baron, J. Etenson, M. Brown, A. Solovyov, A. Greenwald, W. Zuckerman, Alex Rose.

With the outbreak of the First World War, Rose was forced to abandon professional aspirations and take a job as a millinery worker; in 1914 he joined the Cloth Hat, Cap, and Millinery Workers' International Union (CHCMW) and became interested in organized labor. In 1918, Rose joined the British Army, and upon returning to America in 1920 resumed union organizing activities. In 1934, the CHCMW merged with the United Hatters of North America to form the United Hatters, Cap and Millinery Workers International Union (UHCMW). He worked his way through union leadership and was elected president of the United Hatters, Cap and Millinery Workers International Union in 1950, where Rose sought to root out Communist and gangster influence from unions.

In 1936, Rose co-founded the American Labor Party. Because the communists acquired influence in the ALP, in 1944 Rose, along with David Dubinsky, Ben Davidson, and others founded the Liberal Party of New York. Rose became its vice-chairperson. Under Rose's leadership, the Liberal Party was quite influential in New York politics and somewhat influential in national politics, exercising power by endorsing Democratic and occasionally, liberal Republican candidates. In 1966 Rose successfully lobbied Senator Robert F. Kennedy to campaign on behalf of judge Samuel Silverman to clean up corruption from the surrogate court.

Rose was one of the most brilliant political strategists of the 20th century. Perhaps his greatest triumph was in the New York City mayoral election of 1969. John V. Lindsay was elected mayor as a fusion candidate (Republican-Liberal) in 1965, but was denied the Republican nomination in 1969. Alex Rose directed Lindsay's reelection campaign in 1969 as the Liberal candidate against both Democratic and Republican opponents so successfully that he not only was reelected, but he brought on his coat-tails enough Liberal councilmen to displace the Republicans as minority party in the City Council.

== Legacy ==
One block of W. 186th Street in Manhattan (between Chittenden Avenue & Cabrini Boulevard) is named "Alex Rose Place."

After Rose's death in 1976, leadership of the Liberal Party passed to Raymond B. Harding, who also exerted a considerable amount of influence in New York State politics until the party lost its ballot line in 2002.

== External sources ==
- Maisel, L. Sandy; Forman, Ira N., eds. (2001). Jews in American Politics. Rowman & Littlefield.
- Robert Kennedy and His Times by Arthur M. Schlesinger, Jr.
- Johnston, Laurie; Anderson, Susan (April 11, 1983). "A Place for Alex Rose". The New York Times.
- Liberal Party of New York State Records

Trade union offices
Preceded by Max Zaritsky	President of the United Hatters, Cap and Millinery Workers International Union; 1950–1977	Succeeded by Nicholas Gyory
Preceded by Harry C. Bates; Dave Beck	American Federation of Labor delegate to the Trades Union Congress; 1950; With: J. P. McGurdy	Succeeded by Richard J. Gray; Charles J. MacGowan
