= Max Zaritsky =

American labor leader (1885–1959)

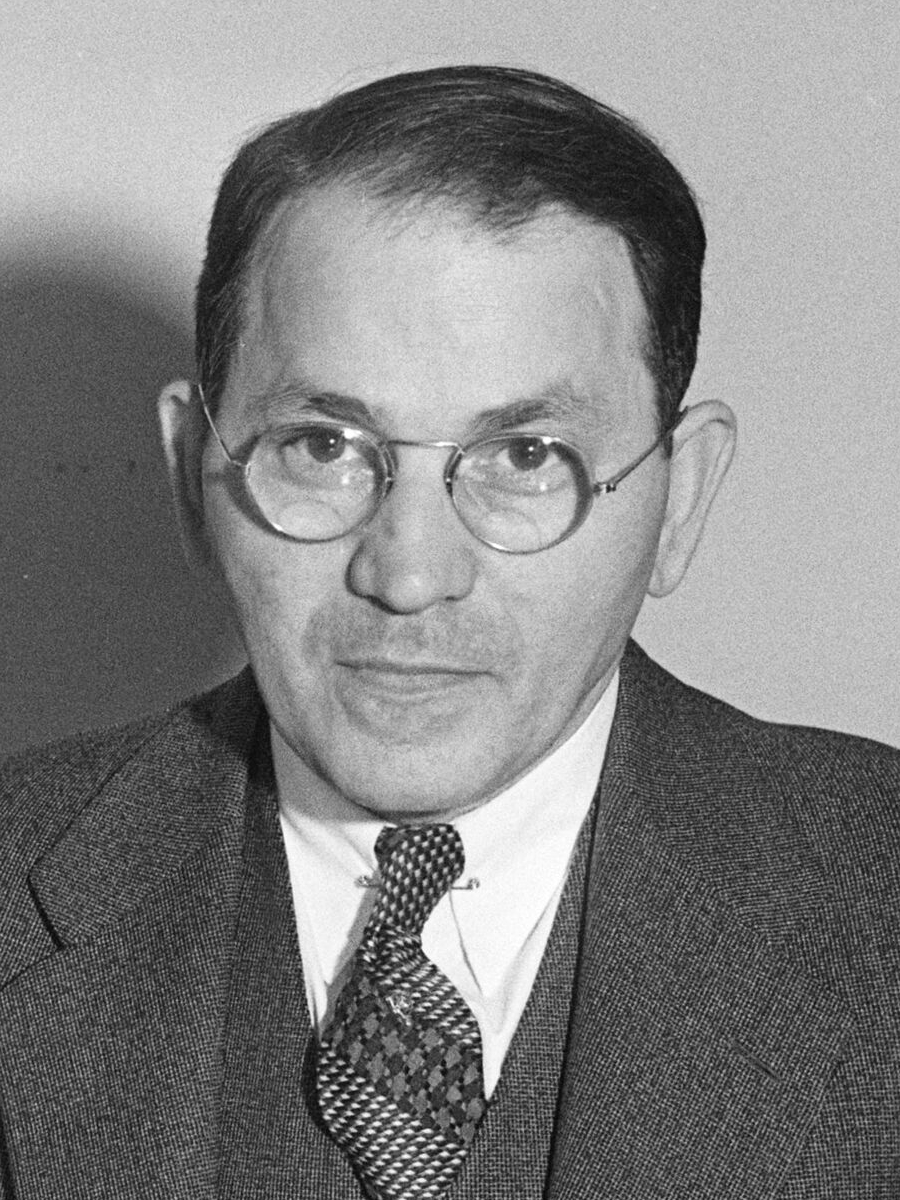
- Zaritsky in 1935

President of the United Hatters, Cap and Millinery Workers International Union
- In office c. April 1936 – May 1, 1950
- Preceded by: Michael F. Greene
- Succeeded by: Alex Rose

Secretary-Treasurer of the United Hatters, Cap and Millinery Workers International Union
- In office c. February 1934 – c. April 1936
- Preceded by: Office established
- Succeeded by: Michael F. Greene

President of the Cloth Hat, Cap and Millinery Workers International Union
- In office May 12, 1927 – c. February 1934
- Preceded by: Abraham Mendelowitz
- Succeeded by: Office abolished
- In office c. September 1919 – 1924
- Preceded by: Office established
- Succeeded by: Abraham Mendelowitz

Personal details
- Born: April 15, 1885 Petrikov, Russian Empire (now Belarus)
- Died: May 10, 1959 (aged 74) Boston, Massachusetts, U.S.
- Party: American Labor; Liberal
- Spouse: Sophia Pilavin
- Known for: Founder of United Hatters, Cap, and Millinery Workers International Union

Max Zaritsky (April 15, 1885 – May 10, 1959) was Belarusian-born Jewish-American labor leader who founded and led the United Hatters, Cap and Millinery Workers International Union (UHCMW), in addition to co-founding both the American Labor Party and Liberal Party of New York.

== Background ==
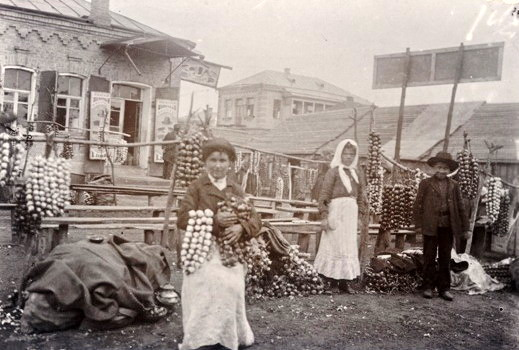
Zaritsky was born in Petrikov (now Pyetrykaw, Belarus), here shown in a 1912 market for onions and garlic

Max Zaritsky was born on April 15, 1885 in Petrikov, in the Russian Empire (now Belarus). His father was a rabbi. In 1906, he immigrated to the United States at age 21.

== Career ==
=== Union leadership ===
==== Hatters, Cap and Millinery Workers International Union ====
In 1906, Zaritsky got a job in a hat and cap factory in Boston. In 1911, he became general secretary of the millinery union. In 1919, he became president of the Cloth Hat, Cap and Millinery Workers Union. In 1934, the Cloth Hat, Cap and Millinery Workers Union merged with the United Hatters of North America union to form the United Hatters, Cap and Millinery Workers International Union (UHCMW), headquartered in New York, and in 1936, Zaritsky became its president.

Zaritsky ousted Communist influence from his union.

==== CIO ====
In 1935, United Mine Workers president John L. Lewis formed a "more militant" group within the American Federation of Labor (AFL) called the Committee for Industrial Organizations. He formed it with Zaritsky of UHCMW, Sidney Hillman, head of the Amalgamated Clothing Workers of America; David Dubinsky, President of the ILGWU, Thomas McMahon, head of the United Textile Workers; John Sheridan of the Mine, Mill and Smelter Workers Union; and Harvey Fremming of the Oil Workers Union. They announced the committee's creation on November 9, 1935, and in 1938, after the AFL revoked the charters of these members, they formed the Congress for Industrial Organizations (CIO).

Zaritsky opposed the CIO's break from the AFL and, with David Dubinsky, initiated a "peace move" between the nascent CIO and its AFL parent.

=== Political leadership ===
==== American Labor Party ====
In 1936, Zaritsky had joined Sidney Hillman and John L. Lewis in forming the Labor Non-Partisan League (LNPL), which formed the basis of the American Labor Party (ALP), making Zaritsky an ALP co-founder.

==== Liberal Party of New York ====
In 1944, Zaritsky co-founded the ALP split-off of the Liberal Party of New York.

=== Later life ===
In 1950, Zaritsky retired after 39 years as a labor union official, succeeded by Alex Rose, also a co-founder of the ALP and Liberal Party.

Zaritsky also lectured to colleges and schools on labor issues.

== Personal life and death ==
Zaritsky married Sophie Pilavin.

Zaritsky was a Labor Zionist and served as treasurer of the National Labor Committee for Palestine as well as the National Committee for a Leon Blum Colony in Palestine (whose patrons included Herbert H. Lehman, Fiorello H. LaGuardia, Abraham Cahan, Albert Einstein, Felix Frankfurter, Israel Goldstein, Julian W. Mack, Edward F. McGrady, and Robert F. Wagner and whose officers included Rose Schneiderman and Lucy Lang).

Max Zaritsky died age 74 on May 10, 1959, in Boston, Massachusetts, after leaving New York City two years earlier. He is buried in the Mount Carmel Cemetery of Queens, New York.

In 1991, American Heritage magazine carried a reminiscence of Zaritsky.

== Legacy ==
At his death in 1959, The New York Times declared, "Although his union had only 40,000 members, Mr. Zaritsky won a position of major influence in labor's affairs." His papers are at the Tamiment Library at New York University.

== See also ==
- United Hatters, Cap and Millinery Workers International Union
- United Hatters of North America
- Committee for Industrial Organizations
- American Labor Party
- Liberal Party of New York
- Alex Rose (labor leader)

== External sources ==
- Tamiment Library: Guide to the Max Zaritsky Papers TAM.006
- Historical Society of Pennsylvania: Max Zaritsky at fifty; the story of an aggressive labor leadership
- Howard, Adam M. (2017). Sewing the Fabric of Statehood: Garment Unions, American Labor, and the Establishment of the State of Israel. University of Illinois Press. p. 154. ISBN 9780252050060.
- Images:
  - Historic Images: Max Zaritsky (1936)

Trade union offices
Preceded by New position	President of the Cloth Hat, Cap and Millinery Workers International Union; 1919–1924	Succeeded by Abraham Mendelowitz
Preceded by Abraham Mendelowitz	President of the Cloth Hat, Cap and Millinery Workers International Union; 1927–1934	Succeeded by Union merged
Preceded by Union founded	Secretary-Treasurer of the United Hatters, Cap and Millinery Workers International Union; 1934–1936	Succeeded by Michael F. Greene
Preceded by Michael F. Greene	President of the United Hatters, Cap and Millinery Workers International Union; 1936–1950	Succeeded by Alex Rose
