= Charles H. Revson Foundation =

Charitable organization

- Formation: 1956
- Headquarters: New York, NY, United States
- Chairman: Cheryl Cohen Effron
- Key people: Julie Sandorf (President)
- Revenue: $6,148,911 (2017)
- Expenses: $7,904,801 (2017)
- Website: revsonfoundation.org

The Charles H. Revson Foundation was founded in 1956 by Charles H. Revson, the founding President of Revlon Cosmetics as a vehicle for his charitable giving. He willed half of his estate to the Foundation upon his death. Julie Sandorf has been the President of the Foundation since January 2008.

== Background ==
The Foundation was started as Revson and others provided over $10 million dollars in seed money during his lifetime. The Foundation funded schools, hospitals, and service organizations serving the Jewish community, mostly located in New York City. Upon his death, Revson endowed the Foundation with $68 million from his estate and granted the board of directors the discretion to chart the Foundation's future course.

In 1978, the Foundation began a formal grant-making process, and since that time, has disbursed a total of 145 million dollars. The Foundation's endowment has grown to 200 million dollars, and it now disburses over 9 million dollars annually. The Foundation has been responsible for such projects as the Hebrew version of Sesame Street, known as Rechov Sumsum, and the documentary "Civilization and the Jews." The foundation also awarded the grant through which the Gotham Gazette was created.

In 2003, after 25 years, Eli Evans stepped down as the foundation's president, handing over the reins to Lisa E. Goldberg, wife of New York University (NYU) President John Sexton.

After Lisa E. Goldberg's sudden death on January 21, 2007, the position was vacant until filled by Julie Sandorf, formerly the executive director of Nextbook, in January 2008.

== Board of directors ==
- Cheryl Effron, Chair
- Gerald Rosenfeld, Treasurer
- Sharon Greenberger, Secretary
- Stacy Dick
- Dr. Steven Hyman
- Dr. Robert Kingston
- Reynold Levy
- Errol Louis
- Charles H. Revson Jr.
- Pamela Wasserstein

== Directors Emeritus ==
- Robert S. Rifkind Partner, Cravath Swaine & Moore
- Philip Leder
- Lisa E. Goldberg
- Henry Louis Gates Jr.
- Helaine M. Barnett
- Victor Barnett
- Alice Chandler
- Robert Curvin
- Suzanne Gluck
- Jeffrey Goldberg
- Jerome Groopman
- Beatrix Hamburg
- Matina Horner
- Arthur Levitt Jr.
- Ruth B. Mandel
- Dr. Paul A. Marks
- Martha Minow
- Matthew Nimetz
- Louis Perlmutter
- John C. Revson
- Clifford Tabin
- Harold Tanner
- Benjamin Buttenwieser
- Red Burns
- Joshua Lederberg
- Adrian W. DeWind
- Harry Meresman
- Simon Rifkind

== Program areas ==
With Revson's giving as a guide, the board of directors for the foundation has established four program areas:

=== Urban affairs ===
The Foundation, based in New York City, focuses its urban program on the city's future. It seeks to enhance the capacity of individuals, organizations, and the public sector to improve New York and the lives of those who live and work there.

Developing leadership for New York is the goal of one group of foundation grants. These programs identify talented individuals, bring them together for learning, training, and the exchange of ideas, and build networks equipped to address the challenges of tomorrow. "Leaders are like dancers; they are born with talent but have to learn the steps," commented one participant. The programs build bridges across sectors, like neighborhood organizations and the business community, the school system and arts institutions, by including women and men from many fields and introducing them to players from diverse areas. They give leaders — and potential leaders — an opportunity to deepen their knowledge, gain skills, be exposed to different viewpoints and experiences, learn, and grow.

The transfer of responsibility for many programs from Washington to state and local government has had major implications for New York. Dramatic shifts in welfare and other programs call for particular attention to the impact of policy changes on the most disadvantaged New Yorkers, who rely on such government aid. A portion of the Foundation's grantmaking supports organizations that monitor actions taken in New York City and Albany, work to shape policies that benefit the city, and see that they are carried out fairly, efficiently, and in a timely manner.

The Foundation has supported a variety of projects to examine the possibilities for financing, delivering services, and planning the urban environment in the next century. Several grants have assisted projects that use technology in innovative ways — for example, a computer model of the city that allows planners, architects, and community groups to visualize the effect of proposed projects before they are approved, and a website that will serve as a central source for information on public policy and civic life in New York.

=== Education ===
The education program has a focus of making the government more representative of, and more responsive to, its citizens.

Citizen organizations play a critical part in the democratic system, monitoring government policy and reporting the results to the public. This helps the government to be more accountable to the citizens.

Communications technology is focused on by the Foundation via television and the Internet. A part of the Communications program seeks innovative uses of technology to communicate with citizens and encourage their participation.

Public interest legal organizations are used in representation of individuals and strategies to improve law enforcement, thereby providing an important mediating link between citizens and the government. To attract talented people to public interest work, the Foundation has supported programs that place law students, especially women and minorities, in summer internships at nonprofit, legal aid, and government agencies.

=== Biomedical research ===
The program in biomedical research is devoted to strengthening basic research through support of programs at key institutions in New York City and in Israel, and to encouraging international cooperation in science in the Middle East.

The Foundation funded postdoctoral fellowships at four New York biomedical research centers, beginning in the early 1980s. Aimed at young scientists, the fellowships enabled them to enter research careers instead of private practice or industry, which would otherwise seem more immediately lucrative. The programs also fund specific institutions and identify priorities for research.

In 1987, the Foundation made a challenge grant that led to substantial government and private contributions, leading eventually to the 1993 establishment of the Israel Science Foundation (ISF), to provide a steady source of funding. To further encourage innovation, the Foundation helped launch an initiative to support research in promising fields that are new or have been neglected in Israel.

=== Jewish Philanthropy and Education ===
The Jewish Philanthropy and Education program strives to increase knowledge and understanding of the Jewish heritage using media, research, and leadership training. It endeavors to increase awareness of Jewish history and culture and to build bridges between people of diverse backgrounds.

A central aspect of this program is that television and film are powerful tools, and are used to educate children about history and engage viewers in novel ways. In this grant period, an interfaith video series featuring Bill Moyers discoursing on the Book of Genesis reached a large number of people. Rechov Sumsum (the Israeli version of Sesame Street) also came out during this time and via this method. It was designed to teach Israeli and Palestinian youngsters about each other. The Jewish Heritage Video Collection.

A portion of the program is devoted to projects that use telecommunications technology to create innovative educational resources. For example, Heritage: Civilization and the Jews has been issued as an interactive DVD-ROM, and the internet is the location for a unique "virtual archive" on Jewish women. A new film uses the archive of videotaped Holocaust testimonies gathered by Yale University to communicate the experience of the Holocaust.

In Israel, the Foundation has directed its resources to critical issues, including a new initiative on the environment. It has continued to support graduate fellowships in Jewish studies. A final group of grants supported efforts to improve understanding between African-Americans and Jews through conferences, theatrical productions, and museum exhibitions.

== Program themes ==
Following extensive discussions with leading thinkers in other foundations, academia, government, science, and the arts, the board also identified as priorities four themes that would be reflected across the above program areas:

- the future of New York City,
- the accountability of government,
- the changing role of women, and
- the impact of modern communications on education and other areas of life.

== See also ==
- Charles H. Revson
- Revlon
- Philanthropy
- Foundation (charity)
