= Carmen Lucia =

Carmen Lucia may refer to:

- Cármen Lúcia (born 1954), Brazilian justice in the Supreme Federal Court
- Carmen Lucia (union organizer) (1902–1985), Italian-American union organizer
