= Australian Bar Association =

- Established: 1963
- Type: Bar association
- Region served: Australia
- Website: austbar.asn.au

The Australian Bar Association (ABA) is the peak body representing more than 6,000 barristers throughout Australia.

The ABA was established in 1963 to serve, promote and represent its members, and advocate for fair and equal justice for all. The ABA's members are barristers registered to practise law in Australia and who are also members of a State or Territory Bar Association.

Its purpose is to promote the administration of justice, the rule of law and the excellence of the Bar. The ABA supports its members and the community by delivering services to promote the rule of law and access to justice; fostering a collegiate, inclusive and diverse national association of barristers; maintaining and enhancing professional standards; and providing opportunities for members to enhance professional performance.

The current president of the ABA is Peter Dunning (Queensland). Roisin Annesley and Dominic Toomey are vice-presidents, Andrew Muller is treasurer and Ian Robertson is chair of the Advocacy Training Council.

== Constituent Bar Associations ==
The ABA's constituent Bar Associations are:

- Australian Capital Territory Bar Association
- Bar Association of Queensland
- New South Wales Bar Association
- Northern Territory Bar Association
- South Australian Bar Association
- The Tasmanian Bar
- Victorian Bar
- Western Australian Bar Association

== Presidents ==
The previous six presidents of the ABA are:

President	State	Year
Fiona McLeod	Victoria	2015
Patrick O'Sullivan	South Australia	2016
E William Alstergren	Victoria	2017
Noel Hutley	New South Wales	2018
Jennifer Batrouney	Victoria	2019
Matthew Howard	Western Australia	2020, 2021
Matt Collins	Victoria	2022

A number of previous presidents of the ABA have subsequently been appointed to Federal and State Courts and Tribunals.

== See also ==
- Law Council of Australia
