= SS Morris C. Feinstone =

Liberty ship of WWII

History

United States
- Name: Morris C. Feinstone
- Namesake: Morris Feinstone
- Owner: War Shipping Administration (WSA)
- Operator: Black Diamond Steamship Company
- Ordered: as type (EC2-S-C1) hull, MC hull 2499
- Awarded: 23 April 1943
- Builder: St. Johns River Shipbuilding Company, Jacksonville, Florida
- Cost: $971,848
- Yard number: 63
- Way number: 3
- Laid down: 5 September 1944
- Launched: 10 October 1944
- Sponsored by: Mrs. Morris C. Feinstone
- Completed: 22 October 1944
- Identification: Call sign: KTFE
- Fate: Laid up in the James River Reserve Fleet, Lee Hall, Virginia, 17 November 1947; Sold for scrapping, 27 February 1970, withdrawn from fleet, 1 May 1970

General characteristics
- Class & type: Liberty ship; type EC2-S-C1, standard
- Tonnage: 10,865 LT DWT; 7,176 GRT
- Displacement: 3,380 long tons (3,434 t) (light); 14,245 long tons (14,474 t) (max)
- Length: 441 feet 6 inches (135 m) oa; 416 feet (127 m) pp; 427 feet (130 m) lwl
- Beam: 57 feet (17 m)
- Draft: 27 ft 9.25 in (8.4646 m)
- Installed power: 2 × Oil fired 450 °F (232 °C) boilers, operating at 220 psi (1,500 kPa); 2,500 hp (1,900 kW)
- Propulsion: 1 × triple-expansion steam engine, (manufactured by General Machinery Corp., Hamilton, Ohio); 1 × screw propeller
- Speed: 11.5 knots (21.3 km/h; 13.2 mph)
- Capacity: 562,608 cubic feet (15,931 m^{3}) (grain); 499,573 cubic feet (14,146 m^{3}) (bale)
- Complement: 38–62 USMM; 21–40 USNAG
- Armament: Varied by ship; Bow-mounted 3-inch (76 mm)/50-caliber gun; Stern-mounted 4-inch (102 mm)/50-caliber gun; 2–8 × single 20-millimeter (0.79 in) Oerlikon anti-aircraft (AA) cannons and/or, 2–8 × 37-millimeter (1.46 in) M1 AA guns

SS Morris C. Feinstone was a Liberty ship built in the United States during World War II. She was named after Morris Feinstone, a Polish born wood-carver, master designer, and the executive secretary of the United Hebrew Trades union.

== Construction ==
Morris C. Feinstone was laid down on 5 September 1944, under a Maritime Commission (MARCOM) contract, MC hull 2499, by the St. Johns River Shipbuilding Company, Jacksonville, Florida; she was sponsored by Mrs. Morris C. Feinstone, the widow of the namesake, and was launched on 10 October 1944.

== History ==
She was allocated to the Black Diamond Steamship Company, on 22 October 1944. On 17 November 1947, she was laid up in the James River Reserve Fleet, Lee Hall, Virginia. On 3 August 1953, she was withdrawn from the fleet to be loaded with grain under the "Grain Program 1953", she returned loaded on 20 August 1953. On 10 June 1957, she was withdrawn to be unload, she returned on empty 20 June 1957. On 1 August 1958, she was withdrawn from the fleet to be loaded with grain under the "Grain Program 1958", she returned loaded on 15 August 1958. On 7 January 1960, she was withdrawn to be unload, she returned on empty 15 January 1960. On 24 October 1960, she was withdrawn from the fleet to be loaded with grain under the "Grain Program 1960", she returned loaded on 5 November 1960. On 11 April 1963, she was withdrawn to be unload, she returned on empty 19 April 1963. She was sold for scrapping, 10 April 1972, to Hierros Ardes, SA., for $67,500. She was removed from the fleet, 27 June 1972.

== Bibliography ==
- "St. John's River Shipbuilding, Jacksonville FL". www.ShipbuildingHistory.com. 16 October 2010.
- Maritime Administration. "Morris C. Feinstone". Ship History Database Vessel Status Card. U.S. Department of Transportation, Maritime Administration.
- Davies, James (May 2004). "Specifications (As-Built)" (PDF). p. 23.
- "SS Morris C. Feinstone".
