= Max Pine =

American politician

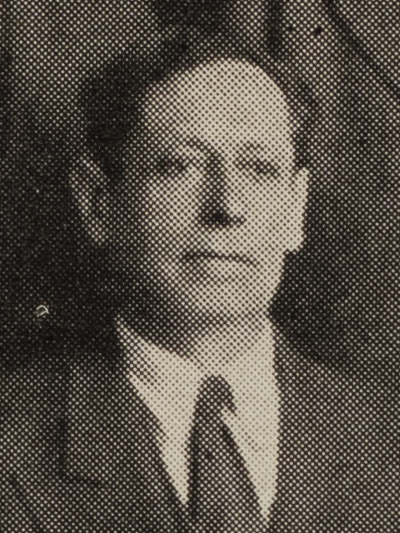
Pine in 1928

Max Pine (April 30, 1866 – March 2, 1928) was a Russian-born American Jewish labor activist.

== Life ==
Max (Mendel) Pine was born on April 30, 1866, in Lyubavichi, Mogilev Governorate, Russia. His father died when he was three, and when he was nine his mother sent him to apprentice as a printer in Velizh.

Pine mastered the trade and learned to set type, but struggled to make a living and moved from place to place looking for work. In 1886, he moved to the USA. Not finding work in the Yiddish publishing field, he worked as a coal man for a few years. He then worked on children's kneepants, only to be fired after six weeks for joining a union. He was among the early wave of Jewish activists organizing the garment workers trade, and his co-workers elected him as secretary of the union. His organization abilities spread to other trades and he was asked to help organize other unions. By the mid-1890s, he was a familiar figure in the young labor movement.

An early success for Pine came when the Knee Pants Makers' Union named him walking delegate. Three weeks later, the union's 1,000 members went on strike. He won several concessions from the strike for the union, including raising the wages from eight dollars a week to twelve and shortening work hours from thirteen or fourteen hours a day to ten.

In 1897, he was one of the founders of The Forward. He worked as a journalist for that paper, and was its editor at one point. He helped organize a tailors' strike that began on December 30, 1912, that involved 100,000 workers. He helped establish the Yidgezkom (Jewish Social Committee for the Relief of Victims of War, Pogroms, and Natural Disasters).

In 1904, he was the Social Democratic candidate for the New York State Assembly in New York County's 12th District, losing the election to Democrat Edward Rosenstein. In 1908, he was the Socialist candidate for the Assembly in New York County's 4th District, losing the election to Democrat Aaron J. Levy. He also ran for Alderman on the Socialist ticket several times on the Lower East Side.

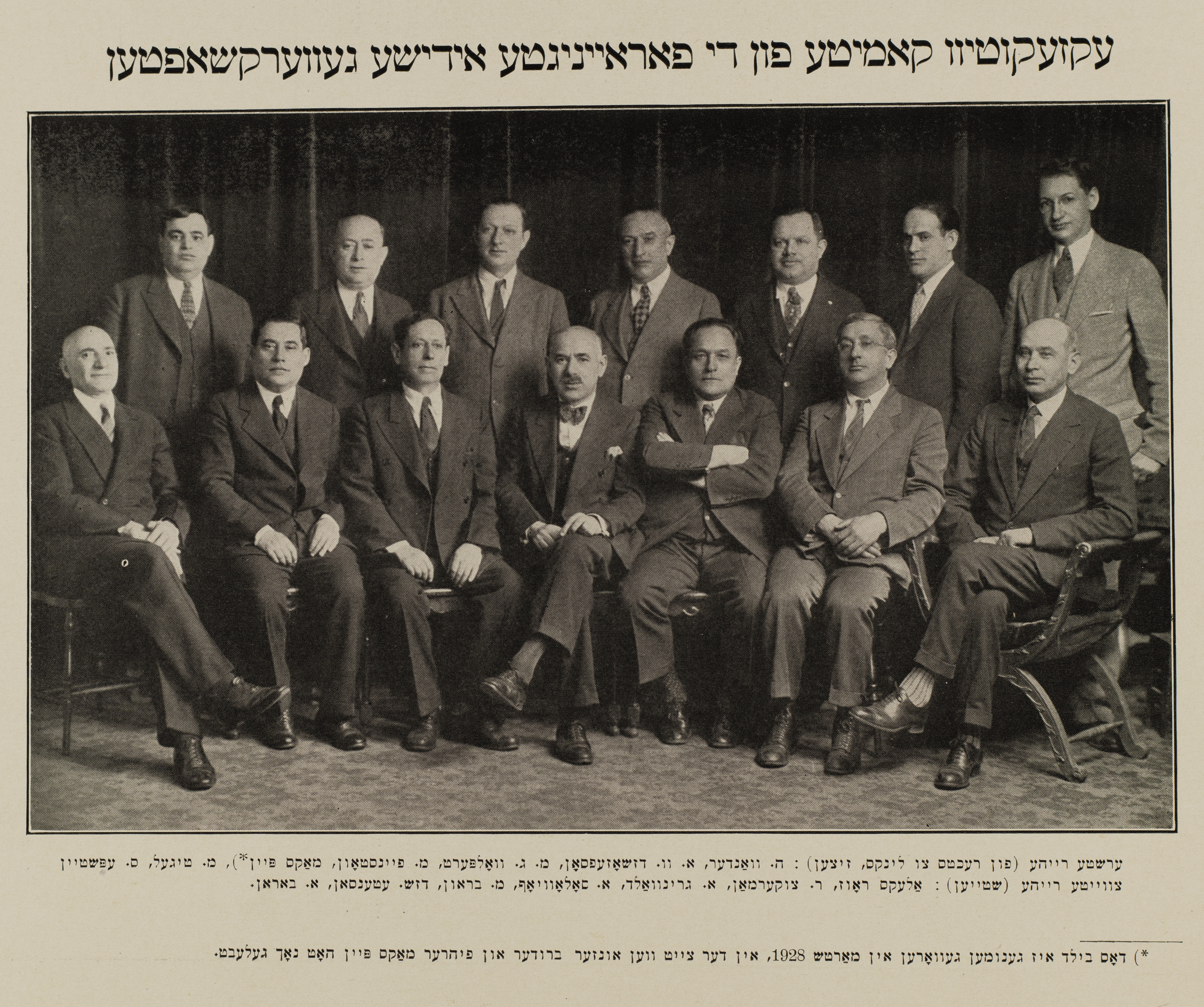
Executive Committee of the United Hebrew Trades, 1928. Seated from left to right: Samuel Epstein, M. Tigel, Max Pine, Morris Feinstone, M. Wolpert, A. Josephson, H. Wander. Standing from left to right: A. Baron, J. Etenson, M. Brown, A. Solovyov, A. Greenwald, W. Zuckerman, Alex Rose.

He was on the national executive committee of the Workmen's Circle from 1922 to 1924 and served as secretary of the United Hebrew Trades. He helped establish the People's Relief Committee, which represented American Jewish labor in the American Jewish Joint Distribution Committee and its work to provide relief to Jews after World War I. In 1920, he and Judge Harry Fisher of Chicago went abroad to investigate conditions among Ukrainian Jews and to negotiate with authorities in Moscow about improving those conditions. The trip became the basis for the Joint's relief activities among Jews in the Soviet Union. When he returned home, he played an important role in propaganda for relief work and was credited with raising large amounts of funds. In 1923, he and colleagues at the United Hebrew Trades organized the first Gewerkschaften Kampein (Yiddish - the Campaign among the [Jewish] trade unions) to raise funds for the Histadrut, the Jewish labor federation formed in the Yishuv (pre-statehood Jewish community in Mandatory Palestine / Eretz Yisroel). Two years later, the Kampein became a permanent event, and the project became known after years as the National Committee for Labor Palestine - after 1948 as the National Committee for Labor Israel.

Pine died of pneumonia at his home in Maywood, New Jersey on March 2, 1928. More than 5,000 people attended the funeral at the Forward Building. Abraham Cahan Jacob Panken, Morris Feinstone, and Baruch Charney Vladeck spoke at his funeral. He was buried in the Workmen's Circle section of Mount Carmel Cemetery. He had a wife, three sons, and two daughter.

A trade school in Tel Aviv, the Max Pine Vocational School, founded in 1935, one of the first vocational schools in pre-State Israel, was named in his honor.
