= Fiona McLeod (barrister) =

Australian barrister

Fiona McLeod AO SC
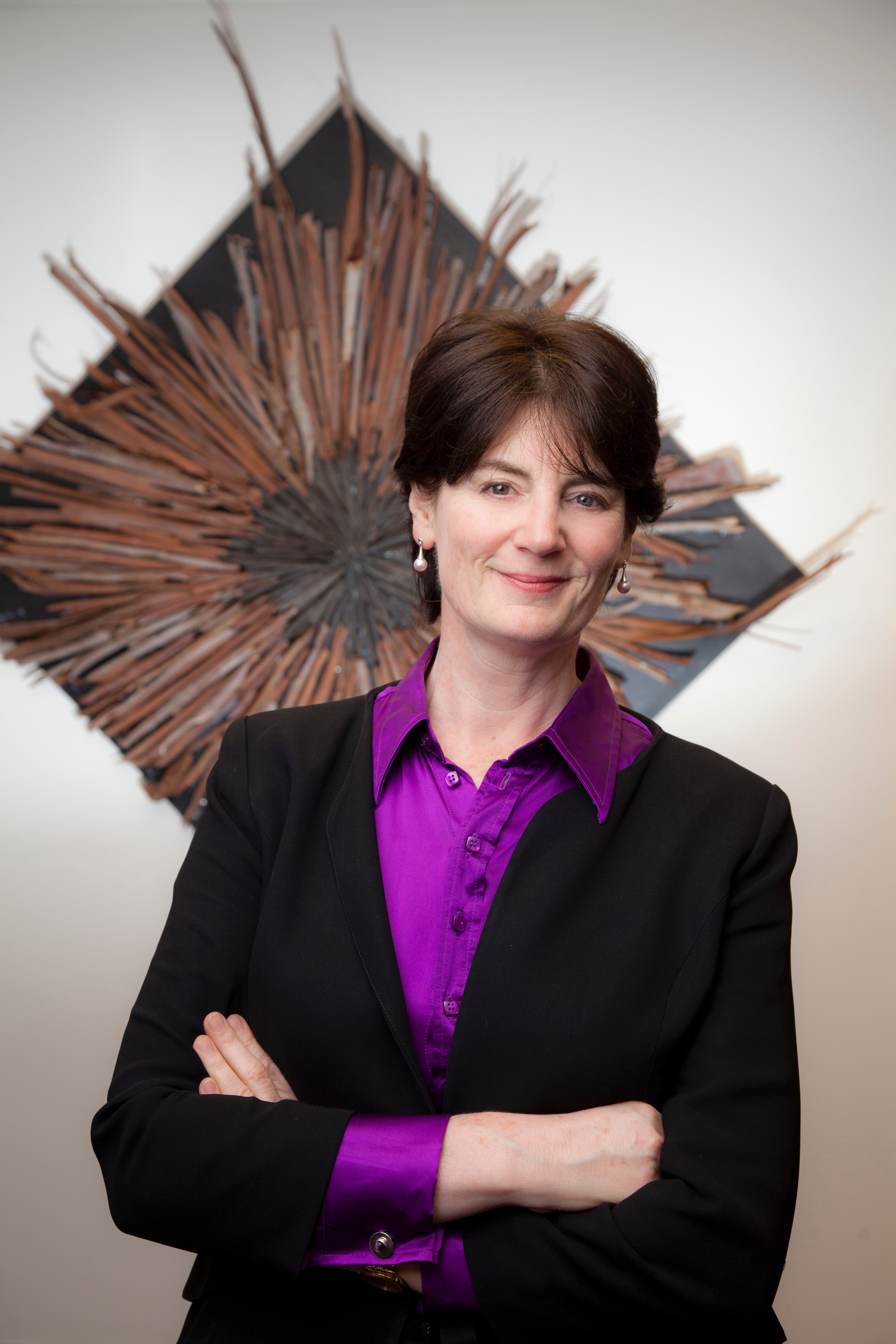
- Fiona McLeod in 2016
- Born: 1964 (age 61–62); Melbourne, Victoria, Australia
- Education: University of Melbourne (BA, LLB, MPub&IntLaw)
- Occupation: Barrister
- Years active: 1991–present

Fiona Margaret McLeod AO SC (born 1964) is an Australian barrister practising at the Victorian Bar.

== Early life and education ==
McLeod's father was a psychiatrist, who presided over the department at the University of Auckland for seven years, until McLeod was 13 years old. Her mother was a biochemist, later a ceramic artist.

McLeod attended the Melbourne Law School at the University of Melbourne, where she enjoyed participating in student theatre productions. She earned a Bachelor of Arts and Bachelor of Laws there, and later Masters of Public and International Law.

McLeod was President of the Australian Law Students' Association in 1987, winning the Butterworths prize for Civil Jurisprudence in the same year.

== Career ==
McLeod was employed as an articled clerk and solicitor by the law firm Cornwall Stodart in Melbourne. She was admitted as a barrister in Victoria in 1991 and started practising at Owen Dixon Chambers. She was appointed Senior Counsel in Victoria in 2003.

In 2013, McLeod was appointed chair of the Victorian Bar Council, and in 2015 was the president of the Australian Bar Association. She was appointed to the executive of the Law Council of Australia in 2014, serving as treasurer in 2015, president-elect in 2016 and President in 2017.

McLeod attended the 2020 Summit participating in the Regional Security and Prosperity stream. At the time she was the President of Australian Women Lawyers.

She is a fellow of the International Academy of Trial Lawyers and the Australian Academy of Law. She is a Council member of the Commonwealth Lawyers Association, the Advisory Council of the University of Melbourne Law School and the Victorian University Sir Zelman Cowan Centre.

She has represented the Commonwealth in major cases, including the Victorian Bushfires Royal Commission, Queensland Floods Commission and the Royal Commission into Institutional Responses to Child Sexual Abuse.

== Political career ==
On 22 March 2019, McLeod replaced Josh Spiegel as the Labor candidate for the seat of Higgins in the 2019 federal election. The change was made from central party leadership who wanted a higher profile candidate, because of reports that the formerly safe Liberal seat was winnable. At that election, she came closer to taking the seat off the Liberals than any Labor candidate had come before. She managed a swing of six percent to Labor, enough to make this longstanding blue-ribbon Liberal seat marginal against Labor for the first time.

On 15 January 2020, it was announced that McLeod would be one of the members of the National Co-design Group of the Indigenous voice to government.

== Awards and honours ==
- In the 2013 Women in Law Awards, McLeod won Barrister of the Year, Mentor of the Year and the Lawyers Weekly Excellence Award.
- 2013 Advocate Award
- On 5 March 2014 McLeod was appointed to the Victorian Honour Roll of Women.
- McLeod was made an Officer of the Order of Australia in the 2020 Australia Day Honours for "distinguished service to the law, and to the legal profession, at the national and international level, and to women lawyers."
