= John A. Moffit =

John A. Moffit (1865 – June 6, 1942) was an American labor unionist and government official.

Born in Newark, New Jersey, Moffit moved to Orange, New Jersey when he was 21, to work as a hatter. He joined the National Hat Makers' Association of the United States, and became business agent of his local. In 1896, the union became part of the new United Hatters of North America. Moffit became vice-president of the union, and then in 1898, became its president, also editing the union journal.

In 1903, and again in 1912/13, Moffit served on the American Federation of Labor's Legislative Committee, and in this role, he helped draft the law which established the United States Department of Labor. In 1913, he was appointed as one of the first commissioners of conciliation for the new department. In the mid-1920s, he became a lawyer in Washington D.C., but he remained a conciliator until his death, in 1942.

Trade union offices
Preceded by Frederick W. Schmalz	President of the United Hatters of North America; 1898–1911	Succeeded by Simon Blake
Preceded by Dennis Driscoll; William D. Ryan	American Federation of Labor delegate to the Trades Union Congress; 1905; With: James Wood	Succeeded by Frank Keyes Foster; James Wilson
