= Cloth Hat, Cap and Millinery Workers International Union =

North American trade union

The Cloth Hat, Cap and Millinery Workers International Union (CHCMW) was a trade union representing workers involved in making headwear in the United States and Canada.

The union was founded in 1901 in New York City as the United Cloth Hat and Cap Makers of North America. It affiliated to the American Federation of Labor (AFL) on 17 June 1902 and was a member of the United Hebrew Trades. Its first women's branch, spearheaded by Rose Schneiderman, was organized in January, 1903. Schneiderman was elected an international vice-president of the union in 1904, making her one of the first women in the American labor movement to achieve such a high rank. She stayed with the union until 1910, when she left to join the Women's Trade Union League.

The organization had an ongoing dispute with the rival United Hatters of North America over which union should organise straw hat makers and millinery workers. In 1917, the AFL decided that these workers should join the Hatters, which led the CHCMW to withdraw, and it was officially suspended from membership in 1918. In 1923, the United Hatters agreed to withdraw from representing milliners, and so the CHCMW was reinstated to the AFL in 1924, the following year adopting its final name. By 1926, it had 11,000 members. In 1934, it merged with the United Hatters of North America to form the United Hatters, Cap and Millinery Workers International Union.

The union's journal was initially named The Cap-Makers' Journal, later becoming Cloth Hat, Cap and Millinery Workers' Journal, and from 1917 The Headgear Worker.

== Leadership ==
=== Presidents ===
1919: Max Zaritsky
1925: Abraham Mendelowitz
1927: Max Zaritsky

=== Secretaries ===
1902: Maurice Mikol
1904: Max Zuckerman
1927: Jacob Roberts
