= Helaine M. Barnett =

American lawyer

- Born: Helaine Phyllis Meresman; New York City, US
- Education: Cornell University; Barnard College; New York University School of Law
- Occupation: Lawyer
- Known for: President, Legal Services Corporation
- Spouse: Victor Barnett (m. 1959; died 2024)
- Children: 2

Helaine M. Barnett is an American legal aid attorney and law professor. She is a former president of the Legal Services Corporation and currently chairs the New York State Permanent Commission on Access to Justice.

== Early life and education ==
Helaine Meresman Barnett was born in New York City to Harry Meresman and Helen Chafets Meresman. She had one younger sister, Janis Meresman Goldman. Her father, a CPA, started his own accounting firm which eventually merged with Deloitte Touche. He was a business and Jewish community leader who served on the boards of Baruch College and Revlon, Inc.

Barnett graduated high school at age 16 and began attending college at Cornell University. After her sophomore year, Barnett became engaged and transferred to Barnard College. She was married in 1959 but returned to school and graduated from Barnard in 1960. Barnett then attended New York University School of Law, giving birth to her first son in 1962, and graduating in the class of 1964. Married and pregnant with her second son, Barnett was admitted to the Bar that same year.

== Career ==
=== Legal Aid Society ===
Barnett joined the Legal Aid Society in 1966 as associate appellate counsel in its Criminal Appeals Bureau. In 1971, she joined Legal Aid’s Civil Appeals Unit and became head of the unit in 1974. At Legal Aid, Barnett brought the first civil contempt motion in the New York Court of Appeals while representing elderly nursing home residents who challenged the closing of a home; she created the society's Homeless Family Rights Project; and she directed Legal Aid's delivery of critical legal assistance in the aftermath of the 9/11 terror attacks. From 1980 to 1985, she served as an adjunct professor at the Benjamin N. Cardozo School of Law. Barnett retired from the Legal Aid Society in 2003, after 10 years as attorney-in-charge of its multi-office Civil Division.

=== Legal Services Corporation ===
From 2004 through 2009, Barnett was the longest-serving president of the federal Legal Services Corporation in Washington, DC. In 2005, she initiated the LSC's annual Justice Gap report which documents the "unmet civil legal needs of low-income Americans."

=== Access to Justice Commission and Legal Hand ===
In 2010, Barnett joined NYU Law’s adjunct faculty and was appointed chair of New York State Chief Judge Jonathan Lippman's Task Force to Expand Access to Civil Legal Services. Barnett remains chair of what is now the New York State Permanent Commission on Access to Justice. While serving as commission chair, Barnett created Legal Hand, a new initiative to provide neighborhood based storefront legal assistance to underserved communities. There are now 5 storefront Legal Hand centers across New York City.

=== ABA Leadership ===
Barnett has also been a prominent leader in the American Bar Association. She has been a member of the ABA’s House of Delegates, and a member of its Board of Governors and Executive Committee, the only civil legal services lawyer ever to have held those positions. She served as the ABA's representative to the United Nations, is a past chair of the ABA Committee on Ethics and Professional Responsibility and has been a member of the Commission on Governance. She has also served as co-chair of New York’s Commission to Promote Public Confidence in Judicial Elections and is a life member of the American Law Institute.

== Awards and honors ==
Barnett has received many professional honors including the ABA Margaret Brent Women Lawyers of Achievement Award, an Honorary degree of Doctor of Laws from Suffolk University, the Lifetime Achievement Award from the New York Law Journal, and the New York State Bar Association Gold Medal. Barnett also delivered the NYU Law School commencement address in May 2005 and the 2004 Sherman Bellwood Lecture at the University of Idaho, previously given by Supreme Court Justices Ruth Bader Ginsburg, Antonin Scalia, and Sandra Day O'Connor.

== Personal life ==
Barnett married London-born businessman Victor J. Barnett in June 1959. Victor Barnett, a member of the Wolfson family of Great Universal Stores, is a former chairman of Burberry. They had two sons, Craig Edward and Roger Lawrence.

Barnett is a board member of the Historical Society of the New York Courts and of Homes for the Homeless. Both she and her husband Victor are emeritus directors of the Charles H. Revson Foundation and leading members of Fifth Avenue Synagogue.

Her husband died on September 20, 2024, at home, aged 91.

== See also ==
- Wolfson family
