= David Maughan =

Australian lawyer

Sir David Maughan QC
- Born: 5 February 1873; Paddington, New South Wales, Australia
- Died: 3 November 1955 (aged 82); Camperdown, New South Wales, Australia
- Education: Balliol College, Oxford
- Spouse: Jean Barton (m. 1909)
- Relatives: Edmund Barton (father-in-law)

Sir David Maughan QC (5 February 1873 – 3 November 1955) was an Australian lawyer. He was one of Sydney's best-known barristers, specialising in Australian constitutional law. He served as president of the Law Council of Australia and as an acting judge of the Supreme Court of New South Wales.

== Early life ==
Maughan was born in Paddington, New South Wales, to Bertha Windeyer (née Thompson) and John Maughan. His father was born in Scotland and his mother was a third-generation Australian, a granddaughter of Sydney's first mayor Charles Windeyer. Maughan attended The King's School, Parramatta, where he was school captain. From 1891 he attended Balliol College, Oxford, graduating Bachelor of Arts (1895) and Bachelor of Civil Laws (1896). He was called to the bar at Lincoln's Inn in 1896 and admitted to the New South Wales Bar in the same year.

== Career ==
Maughan read law with Langer Owen and eventually developed a thriving practice of his own. He was appointed King's Counsel in 1919 and was an "expert in constitutional law". On two occasions, Maughan was appointed as an acting judge of the Supreme Court of New South Wales – for six months in 1924 and also from May 1936 to March 1937. He served multiple terms on the Council of the Bar of New South Wales, was a member of the Barristers' Admission Board, and was president of the Law Council of Australia from 1941 to 1945, the longest-serving president in the council's history.

== Personal life ==
Outside of his professional activities, Maughan was chairman of the Free Library Council and the Big Brother Movement, a director of the Royal Prince Alfred Hospital, a governor of The King's School, Parramatta, and a vice-president of the New South Wales Rowing Association and New South Wales Rugby Union. He was knighted for public service in 1951.

Maughan married Jean Alice Barton on 30 March 1909, and had two children. His father-in-law was Sir Edmund Barton, the first Prime Minister of Australia (1901–1903) and a judge of the High Court of Australia (1903–1920). He served as executor of Edmund Barton's estate and helped preserve his archives.
