= Leon Sanders =

American politician (1867–1937)

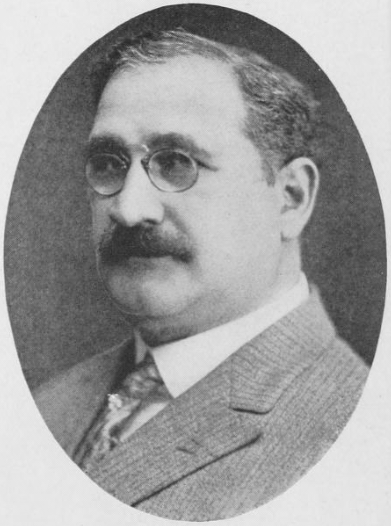

Member of the New York State Assembly from the 12th District, New York County
- In office 1899–1902
- Preceded by: Joseph Schulum
- Succeeded by: Edward Rosenstein

Personal details
- Born: May 25, 1867 Odessa, Russian Empire
- Died: August 18, 1937 (aged 70) California, U.S.
- Party: Democratic
- Spouse: Bertha Fischer
- Children: Frances Van Pragg; Theresa Penner; Nathan N.
- Occupation: Lawyer, politician, judge

Leon Sanders (May 25, 1867 – August 18, 1937) was a Jewish-American lawyer, politician, and judge from New York.

== Early life and education ==
Leon Sanders was born on May 25, 1867, in Odessa, Russian Empire, to Nathan Sanders and Elka Green. He immigrated to America with his parents as a child. Sanders attended New York Law School while working as a clerk for the Commissioner of Jurors in New York City. He was admitted to the bar in 1895.

== Career ==
Sanders began his career working as a clerk for Drake, Mastin & Company, and later as a bookkeeper for the Baumann Brothers and Edison General Electric Company. He eventually specialized in legal matters related to distilleries and wholesale liquor houses, establishing himself as a prominent business lawyer.

A leader in Tammany Hall, Sanders was known for his oratory and debating skills. He was elected to the New York State Assembly in 1898 as a Democrat, representing New York County's 12th District. He served from 1899 to 1902. In 1903, Sanders was elected as a Justice of the New York City Municipal Court, serving until 1913 when he resigned to return to private law practice.

In the 1916 United States congressional election, Sanders ran as the Democratic candidate for New York's 12th congressional district but lost to Socialist Meyer London.

== Community involvement ==
Sanders was deeply involved in Jewish causes and fraternal organizations. He served as president of the Hebrew Sheltering and Immigrant Aid Society and chaired the Committee on Immigration of the American Jewish Congress. Sanders also held leadership roles as Grand Master of the Independent Order of B'rith Abraham and president of the Jewish Fraternal Congress. He was a member of the board of governors of the Jewish Maternity Hospital and a founder and president of Temple Beth-El in Cedarhurst.

== Personal life ==
In 1896, Sanders married Bertha Fischer. They had three children: Frances Van Pragg, Theresa Penner, and Nathan N.

== Death ==
Leon Sanders was killed in a car accident in California on August 18, 1937. He was buried in Mount Lebanon Cemetery.

New York State Assembly
Preceded by Joseph Schulum	New York State Assembly; New York County, 12th District; 1899–1902	Succeeded by Edward Rosenstein
