= Ruyton Girls' School =

Location
- Kew, Victoria; Australia
- 37°48′41″S 145°2′21″E

Information
- Type: Independent, single-sex, day school
- Motto: Latin: Recte et Fideliter (Upright and Faithful)
- Denomination: Non-denominational
- Established: 1878
- Chairman: Peter Nelson
- Principal: Kim Bence
- Employees: ~120
- Years: P–12
- Gender: Girls
- Enrolment: ~850
- Colours: Navy blue, white and gold
- Affiliation: Girls Sport Victoria
- Website: ruyton.vic.edu.au

Ruyton Girls' School, commonly referred to simply as Ruyton, is a non-denominational and independent day school for girls, located on Selbourne Road, Kew, an inner-eastern suburb of Melbourne, Victoria, Australia.

Ruyton was established in 1878 by its first principal, Charlotte Anderson, who named it in honour of the parish in Shropshire, England, Ruyton-XI-Towns, where her great-great-grandfather David Evans had been vicar. Its motto is Recte et Fideliter, meaning "Upright and Faithful", which is also the name of the school song. One of the early educators who taught at the school in the 19th century, was the German author Anna Friederich. In the present-day, Ruyton caters for approximately 850 students from three-year-old Kindergarten and Pre-Prep, to Year 12, with boys being enrolled in Kindergarten and Pre-Prep.

In 2008, Ruyton was ranked second in the state of Victoria based on its VCE results, with 40% of study scores over 40.

The school is affiliated with the Association of Heads of Independent Schools of Australia (AHISA), the Junior School Heads Association of Australia (JSHAA), the Alliance of Girls' Schools Australasia (AGSA), the Association of Independent Schools of Victoria (AISV), and is a founding member of Girls Sport Victoria (GSV).

== Curriculum ==
Ruyton offers students the Victorian Certificate of Education (VCE) program, as well as the Vocational Education and Training (VET) course.

== Co-curriculum ==
The school also offers co-curricular activities such as sport, music, drama and debating. Ruyton is involved regularly in intra-school and inter-school activities, competitions and events, including the Debaters Association Victoria (DAV) debating program, Girls Sport Victoria (GSV) sporting carnivals, the Tournament of Minds (TOM) cross-curricular competition, the Alliance française French speaking, reading and writing competitions, the Boroondara Literary Award, an extensive range of academic competitions and honours and the Duke of Edinburgh Award.

Ruyton also hosts the inter-school Performing Arts House Festival (PAHF), the Alan Patterson Prize for Public Speaking, the Suzanne Northey Award for Public Speaking and the Isobelle Carmody Award for Creative Writing.

=== Sport ===
Ruyton is a member of Girls Sport Victoria (GSV).

==== GSV premierships ====
Ruyton has won the following GSV premierships.

- Athletics (4) – 2009, 2011, 2012, 2013
- Cross Country (17) – 2003, 2004, 2005, 2006, 2007, 2008, 2009, 2011, 2012, 2013, 2014, 2015, 2016, 2017, 2018, 2019, 2023, 2025, 2026
- Hockey (3) – 2005, 2006, 2011
- Softball – 2017
- Swimming – 2013
- Triathlon, Sprint – 2019

== External programs ==
In Years 11 and 12, students of Ruyton may study their chosen courses with students from the nearby boys’ school, Trinity Grammar. These classes are shared between Ruyton and Trinity. The two schools also collaborate in the annual Trinity-Ruyton musical, in Year 10 to 12 Senior School Play, as well as a Year 9 annual play.

Another of Ruyton's features is its international program, providing international opportunities and student exchange visits through the Sister School Network, a regime created in 1989 that has expanded over the years to include 16 schools throughout Canada, Taiwan, China, New Zealand, the United States, the United Kingdom, France and South Africa.

An Expanding Horizons Programme is run for each year level from Year Three to Year Eleven. The program consists of an educational and challenging camp, which visits various parts of Australia, depending on the year level. Camps such as ski camp, surf camp, a political journey to Australia's capital Canberra and a two-week camping tour of Australia's Northern Territory are included in the program.

== Exchange ==
Exchange runs from Year's 10 and 11 for girls who want to go overseas and visit sister schools or the schools around the area of the continent the girls visit. Sometimes girls from other schools around the world have a couple of girls come and visit Ruyton on their exchange. Girls from Years 3 to 11 are all taken on an annual camp, while other camps available include music camps and international study tours.

== House system ==
As with most Australian schools, Ruyton utilises a house system. Girls from Prep to Year 12 are divided into four houses, each named after a former Principal of Ruyton – Anderson (red), Bromby (navy), Daniell (sky blue), and Lascelles (white).

The houses are primarily sporting houses, competing annually in athletics, swimming and cross-country carnivals. They are also involved in inter-house debating and performing arts (PAHF) festivals.

== Associated schools ==
Ruyton's brother school is Trinity Grammar in Kew. At VCE level, they conduct co-educational classes. Girls also may go to Trinity for classes and vice versa. From years 9–12 students from both schools are able to take part in the senior musical.

== Notable alumni ==
Alumnae of Ruyton Girls' School are known as Old Girls or Old Ruytonians, and may elect to join the school's alumnae association, the Old Ruytonians' Association (ORA). The Association was founded in 1908, as a way of keeping former students in contact with each other and the School, through social and sporting activities. The current membership of the ORA exceeds 1,300.

- Hacia Atherton; accountant, entrepreneur, philanthropist
- Dame Zara Bate DBE; fashion designer and wife of Harold Holt, former Prime Minister of Australia (also attended Toorak College, Mt Eliza)
- Sarah Billings; runner
- Adrienne Clarke; professor of botany
- Kim Crow; Olympian rower
- Judith Durham AO; singer, actress, composer, pianist and author; lead singer for folk music group the Seekers (also attended The Fahan School)
- Freda Freiberg; academic, educator, film and art critic
- Eliza Gaffney; rower
- Michelle Grattan AO; political reporter for The Age
- Ellen Kent Hughes; doctor and alderman
- Fay Marles; former chancellor of University of Melbourne
- Kate McMillan; judge
- Jean Mitchell; rower
- Cynthia Teague; architect
- Eleanor Price; rower
- Nicola Xenos; AFLW Footballer

== See also ==
- List of schools in Victoria
- List of high schools in Victoria
