= Matthew Collins (barrister) =

Australian barrister

Matthew Collins AM KC
- Born: 17 February 1970 (age 56); Adelaide
- Education: Melbourne University
- Occupation: Barrister
- Notable work: The Law of Defamation and the Internet; Collins on Defamation
- Partner: Leonard Vary
- Honours: Member of the Order of Australia (2019)
- Website: Official website

Matthew John Collins AM KC (born 17 February 1970) is an Australian barrister. He practises predominantly in media law, particularly defamation, as well as constitutional and commercial law. He is best known for having acted in a number of high-profile defamation and free speech cases. In the Queen's Birthday honours list for 2019 he became a member of the Order of Australia (AM) for "significant service to the law, to legal standards, and to education." He is a former president of the Australian Bar Association.

== Early life ==
Collins was born in Adelaide to Robyn Dolan and John Collins. He was educated at Port Moresby International High School and Prince Alfred College and studied law and arts at Adelaide University. He was associate to Justice Donnell Ryan of the Federal Court of Australia in Melbourne and a solicitor at Mallesons Stephen Jaques (now King & Wood Mallesons).

Collins has a partner, Leonard Vary, who is the CEO of the Sidney Myer Fund and the Myer Foundation. They live in Melbourne.

Collins is the older brother of Luke Collins, journalist and former New York Correspondent of The Australian Financial Review.

== Professional life ==
Collins was admitted to practise as a lawyer in 1994 and became a barrister in 1999. He was appointed Senior Counsel in 2011 and Queen's Counsel in 2014.

Collins holds a PhD from Melbourne University. His 1999 thesis led to his first book, The Law of Defamation and the Internet (Oxford University Press), which ran to three editions. He also wrote Collins on Defamation (Oxford University Press), a text on the law of libel and slander in England and Wales.

Collins has acted in a number of significant media law cases, including Andrew Bolt's trial for racial discrimination under section 18C of the Racial Discrimination Act, the Joe Hockey v Fairfax Media ‘Treasurer for Sale' litigation, and actress Rebel Wilson's defamation case against Bauer Media, which reportedly resulted at the time in the highest damages award in a defamation case in Australian history. This award was subsequently reduced on appeal. Collins represented Jordan Shanks-Markovina also known as friendlyjordies in the defamation case brought by the NSW Deputy Premier John Barilaro and the ABC's Four Corners program in Federal Court proceedings brought by disgraced cosmetic surgeon Daniel Lanzer. He represented Network Ten in defamation proceedings brought by Bruce Lehrmann, and Victorian Opposition leader John Pesutto in proceedings brought by Moira Deeming.

Collins is a senior fellow at the Melbourne Law School and a former member of the Melbourne Law School Foundation Board. With his partner, Collins has established a scholarship for disadvantaged students in his father's name. They are also major donors to Equality Australia (of which Vary is co-Chair), Founders of the Victorian Pride Centre and supporters of the Malthouse Theatre.

Collins was the president of the Australian Bar Association from November 2021 to November 2022. He was vice-president from November 2019 to November 2021.

Collins is a former member of the council of the Victorian Bar and served as its president from November 2017 to November 2019, senior vice-president, chair of its Readers' Course Sub-Committee, executive of its Education and Professional Development Committee and member of its Indictable Crime Certificate Committee. He is a member of the Board and Council of the Australasian Institute of Judicial Administration and a Fellow of the Australian Academy of Law.

Collins has written widely in other areas, including freedom of speech in the age of terrorism, marriage equality and the Indigenous Voice to Parliament. In 2020, he was named one of Australia's 50 Outstanding LGBTI+ Leaders.

== Bibliography ==
- The Law of Defamation and the Internet (2001, 2005 and 2010). Oxford University Press. ISBN 9780199281824.
- Collins on Defamation (2014). Oxford University Press. ISBN 9780199673520.
