= Max Eckmann =

American politician (1851–1931)

Max Th. Eckmann

Member of the New York State Assembly
- In office 1906–1906
- Preceded by: Edward Rosenstein
- Succeeded by: James A. Foley

Personal details
- Born: November 9, 1851 Berlin, Kingdom of Prussia
- Died: June 22, 1931 (aged 79) Manhattan, New York, U.S.
- Party: Municipal Ownership League
- Spouse: Marie Slupecki
- Children: 5
- Occupation: Politician, manufacturer
- Known for: Organizer of the Independent Order of B'rith Abraham

Max Th. Eckmann (November 9, 1851 – June 22, 1931) was an American politician from New York.

== Early life and education ==
Max Eckmann was born on November 9, 1851, in Berlin, Kingdom of Prussia, the son of Ezekiel Eckmann (1818–1864) and Caroline (Löwenstein) Eckmann (1816–1882). He attended the Jewish Communal School and the Friedrichswerdersches Gymnasium in Berlin.

== Immigration and Career ==
Eckmann emigrated to the United States in 1874 and settled in New York City. On February 18, 1875, he married Marie Slupecki. He was a "manufacturer of novelties" and played an active role in community work. He was one of the organizers of the Independent Order of B'rith Abraham.

== Political career ==
In November 1905, Eckmann was elected on the Municipal Ownership League ticket with Republican endorsement to the New York State Assembly (New York County, 12th District), defeating the incumbent Democrat Edward Rosenstein. Eckmann served in the 129th New York State Legislature in 1906. Rosenstein contested Eckmann's election, accusing him of fraudulent proceedings, but the Assembly Committee on Elections rejected the contest.

== Legal Issues ==
On April 7, 1906, during a probe into alleged frauds during the November 1905 election, Benjamin M. Goldberger admitted that Eckmann's M.O.L. nomination petition was a forgery. Eckmann later admitted that he and his five children had fabricated the nomination petition by copying names from a directory and another candidate's petition, writing all the signatures themselves. The trial was held in the Criminal Branch of the New York Supreme Court. Goldberger turned State's evidence, detailing how the petitions were forged. On June 5, 1906, Eckmann pleaded guilty to conspiracy, a misdemeanor. He was fined $500.

== Death ==
Max Eckmann died on June 22, 1931, at his home at 460 Grand Street in Manhattan, from a heart attack.

New York State Assembly
Preceded by Edward Rosenstein	New York State Assembly; New York County, 12th District; 1906	Succeeded by James A. Foley
