= Neil Young (judge) =

Australian judge

The Honourable Neil John Young KC

Judge of the Federal Court of Australia
- In office 30 November 2005 – 24 January 2007

Personal details
- Born: 7 January 1952 (age 74)

Neil John Young KC is a Melbourne barrister and former Judge of the Federal Court of Australia on which he served from 30 November 2005 to 24 January 2007.

== Early life ==
Young was educated at St Bede's College, Mentone. In 1973, Young completed his law degree with first class honours at Melbourne University. He was a tutor at Melbourne University and Ormond College. He completed a LL.M. at Harvard in 1977.

His wife, Inga Arnadottir, is the Honorary Consul-General for Iceland in Australia.

== Career ==
Young was admitted to the Victorian Bar on 3 March 1975. From 1975 to 1976 he was Judge's Associate to High Court Justice Sir Ninian Stephen.

Young spent a year with a Wall Street law firm and a year working for the Australian practice Allen Allen & Hemsley, before he began practising at the Victorian Bar in 1979. He practices commercial law, corporations law, trade practices, appeal cases and taxation. He was appointed Queen's Counsel in 1990. In 1997-1998 he was Chairman of the Victorian Bar, and President of the Australian Bar Association in 1999. In November 2005, he was appointed Judge of the Federal Court of Australia, at which time his colleagues described him as "one of the most organised people imaginable. Painstakingly so. He is conscientious and utterly measured in his courtroom presentation, much to the chagrin of fellow barristers whose cases fell to Young's medium-paced delivery."

In January 2007, Young stepped down from the bench, returning to private practice. In 2016 and 2017 the Doyle's list of 'Leading Competition Law Barristers' included Neil as one of Australia's leading preeminent Senior Counsels.

He practices in the High Court, Victorian Supreme Court, the Federal Court and various other jurisdictions including New South Wales, Queensland, Tasmania, South Australia and Western Australia.
