= Michael F. Greene =

Michael F. Greene (January 1, 1884 – October 20, 1951) was an Irish-born American labor union leader.

Born in County Clare in Ireland, Greene emigrated to the United States in 1887, settling in Connecticut. He left school at the age of 13, and later completed an apprenticeship as a hatter, in Danbury, Connecticut. He joined the United Hatters of North America in 1904 and, after working in various locations, returned to Danbury and held various leadership positions in his union local.

In 1918, Greene was elected as president of the United Hatters. In 1925, he served as the American Federation of Labor's delegate to the British Trades Union Congress, and was also a U.S. delegate to the labor council of the League of Nations, in Bern.

In 1934, Greene organized a merger which formed the United Hatters, Cap, and Millinery Workers International Union. He served as its president until 1936, and then as secretary-treasurer until 1949.

Trade union offices
Preceded by John W. Sculley	President of the United Hatters of North America; 1918–1934	Succeeded by Union merged
Preceded by Michael Casey; John Coefield	American Federation of Labor delegate to the Trades Union Congress; 1928; With: W. B. Fitzgerald	Succeeded by W. P. Carney; W. J. Rooney
Preceded by Union founded	President of the United Hatters, Cap and Millinery Workers International Union; 1934–1936	Succeeded by Max Zaritsky
Preceded by Max Zaritsky	Secretary-Treasurer of the United Hatters, Cap and Millinery Workers International Union; 1936–1949	Succeeded by Marx Lewis
