= Morris Feinstone =

Jewish labor activist (1878–1943)

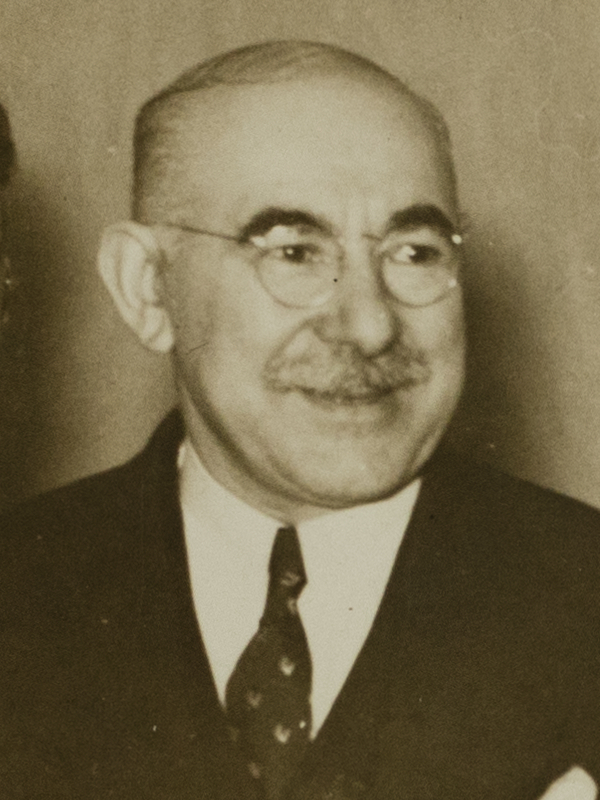
Feinstone c. 1938

Morris Charles Feinstone (28 December 1878 – 28 April 1943) was a Jewish Polish-born British and American labor activist.

== Life ==
Feinstone was born on 28 December 1878, in Warsaw, Poland, the son of an umbrella maker.

Feinstone attended the Warsaw Art School and became a skilled carver, designer, and master draftsman. He was imprisoned for participating in revolutionary activities, after which he emigrated to Germany. He then moved to England and began working as a woodcarver. He joined the Woodcarver's Union in London and was elected its president in 1895. He was also active in the early organizing activities of the British Labour Party in Birmingham.

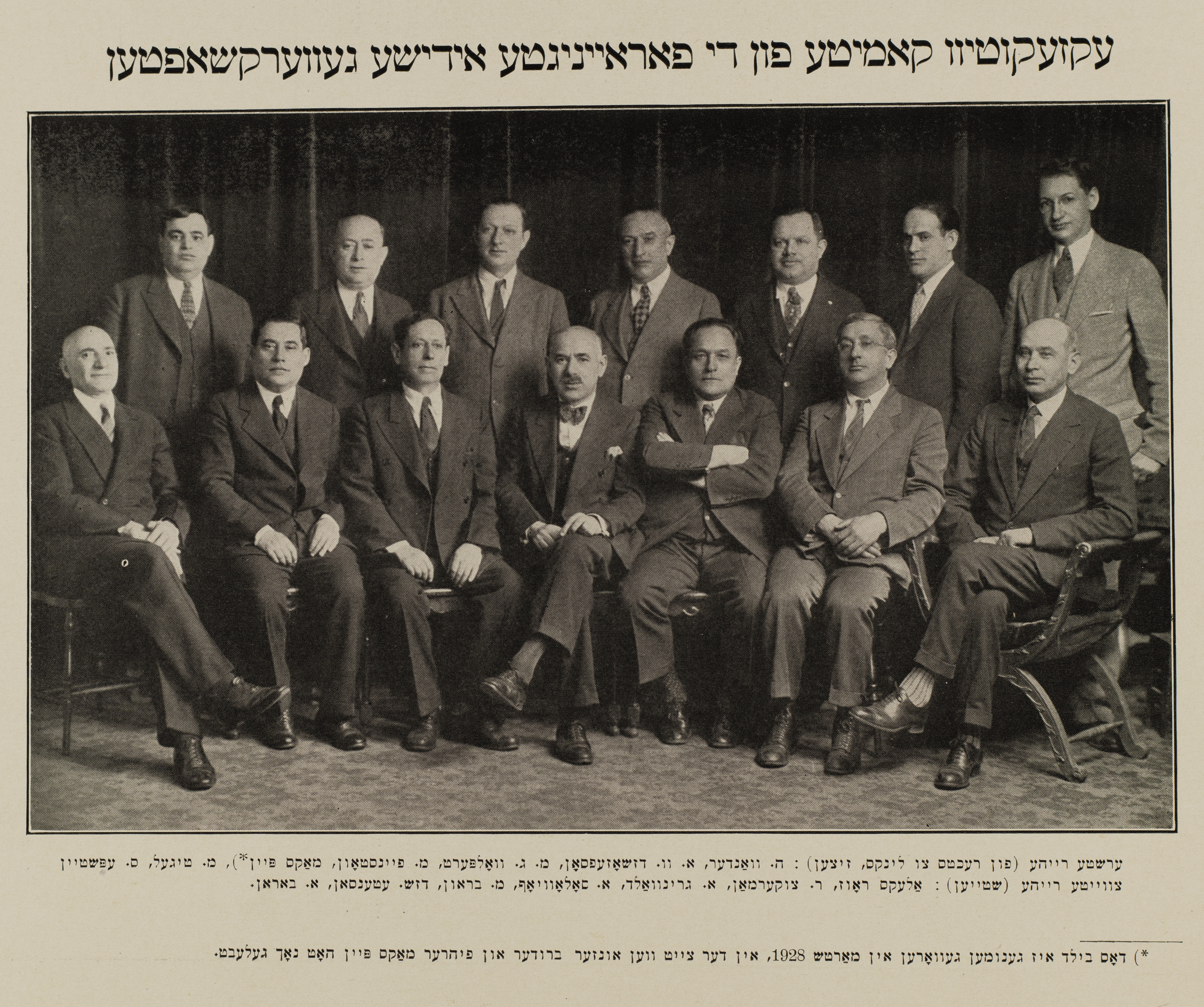
Executive Committee of the United Hebrew Trades, 1928. Seated from left to right: Samuel Epstein, M. Tigel, Max Pine, Morris Feinstone, M. Wolpert, A. Josephson, H. Wander. Standing from left to right: A. Baron, J. Etenson, M. Brown, A. Solovyov, A. Greenwald, W. Zuckerman, Alex Rose.

Feinstone immigrated to America in 1910. He was an organizer with the Umbrella and Cane Industry Union from 1913 to 1915. He then worked as assistant secretary of the United Hebrew Trades from 1915 to 1925. He became its secretary-treasurer in 1928, when he succeeded his close associate Max Pine. He continued Pine's policy of supporting the socialist labor sector of Jewish Palestine via the Histadrut. He represented the United Hebrew Trades on the executive board of the Central Trades and Labor Council of Greater New York. He also wrote articles for the New York Call and The Jewish Daily Forward that endorsed socialism and labor Zionism. He worked to establish an independent labor party, and following the New Deal his socialist teachings were incorporated by the American Labor Party.

In 1934, he became an advisory committee member of the New York State National Recovery Administration Committee. In 1937, Mayor Fiorello La Guardia appointed him a member of the Labor Relations Board. He was the administrative committee chairman of the National Labor Committee for Palestine, vice-chairman of the Jewish Labor Committee, a director of HIAS and the National Jewish Hospital in Denver, Colorado, a governing board member of the Rand School of Social Science and The New Leader, a panel member of the regional War Labor Board, and an advisory board member of the OPA and The Forward.

Well known in American labor circles, Feinstone was a close friend and associate of American Federation of Labor presidents William Green and Samuel Gompers. His wife's name was Florence, and his children were Mrs. Isabelle Lubin and Mrs. Pauline Konstantin.

Feinstone died at his home in the Park Central Hotel from a heart attack on 28 April 1943. Mayor La Guardia, City Council President Newbold Morris, The Forward editor Abraham Cahan, The Forward manager Alexander Kahn, vice-president of the American Federation of Labor Matthew Woll, and United Hebrew Trades chairman Rubin Guskin, spoke at his funeral. One thousand people attended his funeral in the Jewish Daily Forward building, including city government officials and labor leaders. He was buried in Mount Carmel Cemetery.

In 1944, the United Hebrew Trades sold millions in War Bonds to finance the purchase of a liberty ship named after Feinstone, the SS Morris C. Feinstone.
