= Rose Marie Bravo =

American businesswoman (born 1951)

Rose Marie Bravo (née LaPila; January 13, 1951, Bronx, New York) is an American businesswoman. During her career, she has occupied leadership positions in several major fashion businesses and is now vice chairman at Burberry, of which she was CEO from 1997 to 2005.

== Biography ==
Bravo's Italian-born father, Biagio LaPila, owned a hairdressing business in the Bronx, New York, and her Sicilian-born mother, Anna, was a seamstress. She attended the elite public Bronx High School of Science She went on to study English literature at Fordham University, graduating in 1971.

She graduated cum laude and joined Abraham and Straus' department store at Long Island as a buyer in 1971. In 1974, she was recruited by Macy's. When Macy's bought I. Magnin in 1988, she headed the acquired asset until the bankruptcy of Macy's in 1992. After five more years as President and Chief Merchant of Saks Fifth Avenue, and member of the Board of Directors of Saks Holdings Inc., Victor Barnett hired her to be chief executive of Burberry.

In her new job, she initiated a radical reform of the British classic brand and improvements of the company structure. Her strategy included signing top model Kate Moss and recruiting the young designer Christopher Bailey in 2001, who was working for Gucci at that time. The Burberry line of products was greatly increased and especially the newly added perfumes contributed to the company's raising profits. Under her tenure, Burberry launched fragrances, purses, children's wear and doggie macs.

With Bravo as a CEO, Burberry managed to expand greatly on the US market. The company's sales doubled from US$470 million to US$1 billion. The same happened to the profits, e. g. in the six months before September 30, 2003 they increased to a total of US$115 million.

In 2005, Burberry announced Bravo would step down for Angela Ahrendts, who had come from Liz Claiborne. Bravo retired as CEO but served as vice chairman of Burberry through the transition to new leadership, finally leaving the company in 2007.

Bravo has served on the Boards of Directors of The Estée Lauder Companies Inc., and Williams-Sonoma, Inc. announced that Rose Marie Bravo was elected to its Board of Directors in 2011.

== Other roles ==
- Member of the Fordham University Board of Trustees

== Awards ==
- 1996: 75 Most Influential Women in business by Crain’s New York Business
- 2004: Top 50 Hall of Fame by the Wall Street Journal
- 2004: #13 Most Powerful Women in Business outside the US by Fortune Magazine
- 2005: #63 in Forbes list of The World's 100 Most Powerful Women
- 2006: Honorary Commander of the British Empire by Queen Elizabeth II
- 2006: Recipient of the Fordham Founder’s Award

== Personal life ==
Rose Marie Bravo is married to William Jackey. The couple sold part of their 15-acre Long Island waterfront estate in Tuthill Cove, East Moriches, Suffolk County, New York in 2022.
