= United Hatters, Cap and Millinery Workers International Union =

20th-century American labor union

United Hatters, Cap and Millinery Workers International Union (UHCMW)
- Predecessor: United Hatters of North America (1896), Cloth Hat, Cap and Millinery Workers International Union (1901)
- Merged into: Amalgamated Clothing and Textile Workers Union
- Founded: 1934
- Dissolved: 1983
- Location: United States of America
- Key people: Max Zaritsky, Alex Rose (labor leader)
- Affiliations: CIO, AFL–CIO

The United Hatters, Cap and Millinery Workers International Union (1934–1983), also known by acronyms including UHCMW, U.H.C. & M.W.I.U. and UHC & MWIU, was a 20th-century American labor union.

== History ==
In 1934, the United Hatters of North America (UHNA) (formed 1896) and the Cloth Hat, Cap and Millinery Workers International Union (CHCMW) (formed 1901), both based in New York, ended their competition by merging to form the United Hatters, Cap and Millinery Workers International Union (UHCMW).

On June 5, 1946, Congressional Quarterly reported how, in the wake of the Strike wave of 1945–1946 and February 1936 Case permanent strike control bill:

President Green of the A. F. L. called upon the President, June 3, to veto the Case (permanent) strike control bill which had been sent to the White House four days earlier. Unless this were done, he told the convention of the United Hatters, Cap and Millinery Workers at New York, "the 7,500,000 members of the A. F. L. will be rebels," and the A. F. L. will use its political strength "to elect men who will repeal this abhorrent legislation."

In August 1948, UHCMW established a Hatters Union, Local No. 125 at the Texas-Miller Products.

UHCMW failed to get International Hat Company employees to join its union.

UHCMW was a member of the International Clothing Workers' Federation (IGWF), a global union federation representing workers involved in making and repairing clothes, as well as the International Textile and Garment Workers' Federation (ITGWF), also a global union federation of unions representing workers involved in manufacturing clothing and other textiles, and the International Textile, Garment and Leather Workers' Federation (ITGLWF), which in 1970 resulted from the merger of the International Textile and Garment Workers' Federation and the International Shoe and Leather Workers' Federation.

The hat and millinery trade went into decline in the US, and in 1983 UHCMW merged into the Amalgamated Clothing and Textile Workers Union (ACTWU).

== Leaders ==
=== Presidents ===
1934: Michael F. Greene
1936: Max Zaritsky
1950: Alex Rose
1977: Nicholas Gyory

=== Secretary-Treasurers ===
1934: Max Zaritsky
1936: Michael F. Greene
1949: Marx Lewis
1956: Alex Rose
1965: Alfred Smoke
1970s: Gerald R. Coleman
1979: Nicholas Gyory

=== Other leaders ===
- Martin Lawlor: label secretary
- Carmen Lucia: vice president
- Alfred Braunthal: research director

== Legacy ==
In 1995, ACTWU merged with the International Ladies Garment Workers Union to form UNITE (Union of Needletrades, Industrial and Textile Employees).

== See also ==
- United Hatters of North America
- Amalgamated Clothing and Textile Workers Union
- International Ladies Garment Workers Union
- UNITE
