= Adrian W. DeWind =

American lawyer

Adrian William DeWind Sr. (December 1, 1913 – August 7, 2009) was a tax attorney, political adviser, and founder of Human Rights Watch.

== Early life and education ==
Adrian DeWind was born in Chicago, Illinois, USA, on December 1, 1913, to Norman and Ethel DeWind. His father was a mechanical engineer. DeWind attended Grinnell College, from where he graduated in 1934. He received his law degree from Harvard Law School in 1937.

== Career ==
=== Private practice ===
After graduating from Harvard, DeWind joined the firm of Sage Gray Todd & Sims, where he began his practice in tax law.

In 1942, at the behest of the prominent tax attorney Randolph E. Paul, DeWind joined the Department of the Treasury to help draft legislation financing the United States participation in World War II. From 1947 to 1948, he was Tax Legislative Counsel for the Department of the Treasury, before joining Paul’s firm, Paul, Weiss, Rifkind, Wharton & Garrison, in 1948. DeWind worked there for 35 years, eventually heading the firm’s tax law department.

=== Government service ===
DeWind was well known for his roles in government as a tax expert and policy adviser. He was on the tax policy commissions for Presidents John F. Kennedy and Lyndon Johnson, and New York State Governors Hugh Carey and Mario M. Cuomo, and was an adviser to the Commissioner of the Internal Revenue Service and as Chief Counsel to the House Ways and Means Committee’s Subcommittee on the Administration of the Internal Revenue Service. DeWind was also a political adviser to Samuel Silverman in his campaign for Manhattan Surrogate and to United States Senator Eugene McCarthy’s 1968 campaign for President.

=== Advocacy ===
Throughout his career, DeWind was a prominent supporter of liberal causes. In 1950, he began a long association with NAACP Legal Defense Fund, then under the leadership of Thurgood Marshall, advising the organization on tax law. He served on the boards of both the Legal Defense Fund and the NAACP Educational Fund.

From 1976 to 1978, he was president of the New York City Bar Association, where he chaired a special task force on taxation for the Municipal Assistance Corporation and made controversial recommendations on the revision of New York tax codes to prevent the exodus of businesses and individuals from the city. The bar under his presidency also recommended stricter and more transparent mechanisms for the oversight of the city’s budget and finances,

In 1976, he served as a founding board member of New York Lawyers for the Public Interest. From 1980 to 1992, he was chairman of the Natural Resources Defense Council. In 1986, he brokered an agreement between the Council and the Soviet Academy of Sciences under which American and Soviet scientists agreed to on-site monitoring of the conditions of underground nuclear testing in both countries. He was also on the board of the Lawyers Alliance for Nuclear Arms Control.

Dewind was also a founder of Human Rights Watch, and monitored the treatment of dissidents in a number of countries, including the Soviet Union, South Korea and Guatemala, where he wrote a report on government-sponsored violence against Mayan villagers.

== Death ==
DeWind died at his home in Manhattan on August 7, 2009. He was 95 years old.

== Sources ==
- Morris, Jeffrey B. “Making Sure We are True to Our Founders”: The Association of the Bar of the City of New York, 1980-1995. New York, NY: Fordham University Press, 1997. ISBN 0-8232-1738-8
- Hevesi, Dennis, "Adrian DeWind, Tax Adviser to Presidents, Dies.", The New York Times, August 19, 2009.
