= Wendy Harris (lawyer) =

Australian barrister

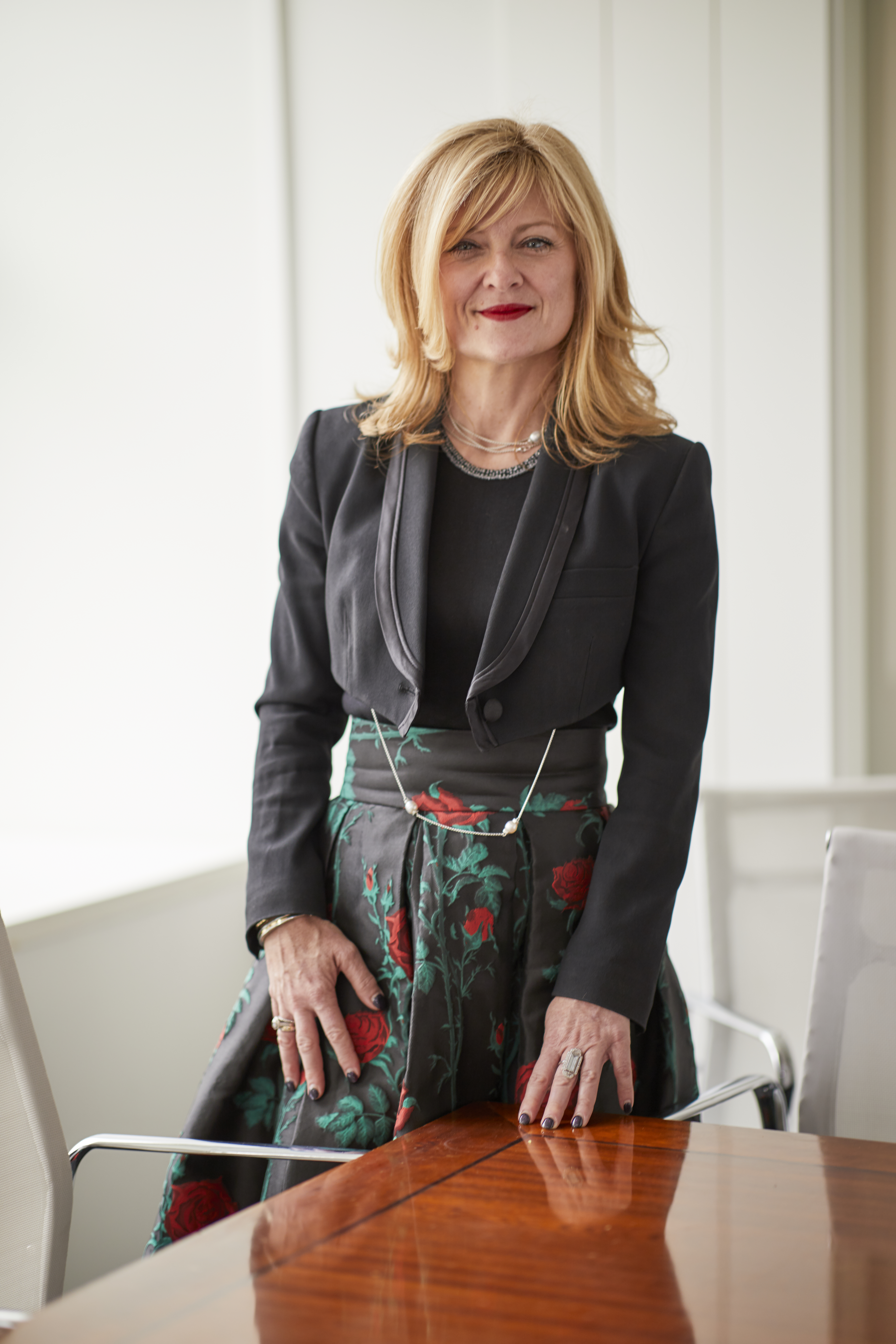
Harris in 2019

Wendy Anne Harris KC (born 14 December 1967) is an Australian barrister, former president of the Victorian Bar and past president of the Commercial Bar Association of Victoria. She is a commercial barrister and King's Counsel specialising in complex disputes, transactional advice and class actions.

== Early life ==
Harris was born in Melbourne to Jan and John Harris. She was educated at Nunawading High School and studied law at the University of Melbourne. She has twin daughters, Ingrid and Ava, born in 2007. Harris is the sister of Justice Claire Harris, of the Supreme Court of Victoria.

== Professional life ==
Harris was admitted to practice as a lawyer in 1992 and was a solicitor from 1992 to 1997 at Arthur Robinson & Hedderwicks (now Allens). She became a barrister in 1997 and is a member of List A Barristers. She was appointed Senior Counsel in 2010, Queen's Counsel in 2014 and elected president of the Victorian Bar in November 2019. She specialises in complex disputes and transactional advice, particularly in the banking and finance, insurance and securities sectors. She has a large class action practice and has acted in numerous securities class actions for Australian Securities Exchange-listed entities. Her banking and finance experience includes acting for the National Australia Bank in the Royal Commission into Misconduct in the Banking, Superannuation and Financial Services Industry and in the bank bill swap rate litigation brought by ASIC, and acting in the context of many large-scale insolvencies. She represents clients in all Victorian courts including the Supreme Court of Victoria and has acted in a significant number of matters in the original jurisdiction of the High Court of Australia and in its appellate jurisdiction.

Harris has held a number of non-executive director roles, including chair of the Peter MacCallum Cancer Centre and the board of Barristers’ Chambers Limited. Until March 2023, she was also a non-executive director of the Australian Commission on Safety and Quality in Healthcare.
