= Public Interest Law Clearing House =

The Public Interest Law Clearing House (PILCH) Victoria was a not-for-profit legal referral service, operated from Melbourne, Victoria, Australia. It was founded in 1994, following the model of New York Lawyers for the Public Interest.

PILCH coordinated pro bono legal assistance for Victorian not-for-profit organisations and individuals, to improve access to justice in Victoria by facilitating pro bono legal services to those otherwise unable to obtain it.

On 1 July 2013, PILCH VIC and PILCH NSW merged to become a new organisation: Justice Connect. Justice Connect continues PILCH's mission, with some slight changes and modifications to the supported programs.

== Schemes ==
Several schemes were run beneath the PILCH banner. Each scheme received requests for assistance and referred cases to its members after establishing that certain criteria are met. The schemes were:

- The PILCH Legal Assistance Scheme, which provides assistance where this would be in the public interest;
- The Law Institute of Victoria Legal Assistance Scheme, which provides solicitors to individuals in need of advice but ineligible for Legal Aid; and
- The Victorian Bar Legal Assistance Scheme, which provides barristers to those in need of representation, but unable to obtain this through Legal Aid.

== Projects ==
PILCH's legal initiatives which are now coordinated by Justice Connect include:

- the Homeless Law clinic, which provides pro bono legal advice to people experiencing or at risk of homelessness; and
- the Human Rights Law Centre, which aims to promote human rights through legal practice;
- Seniors Law, a specialised legal service for older people; and
- Justice Connect Not-for-Profit Law, a clinic focusing on not-for-profit organisations and their legal issues.

== Historical Casework ==
Significant referrals made through PILCH and its associated projects included:

- Evelyn Rannstrom's discrimination claim against the Dandenong Ranges Junior Football League and the Australian Football League;
- Neville Austin's claim for compensation against the Victorian government, the first case in which a member of the stolen generation has sought compensation from the government since Kevin Rudd's apology;
- Vicky Roach's challenge to the constitutionality of a law preventing all prisoners from voting in federal elections;
- The Islamic Council of Victoria's case against Catch the Fire Ministries, the first complaint made under Victoria's Racial and Religious Tolerance Act 2001 (Vic); and
- Ralph Hahnheuser's defence of a civil suit brought against him by a live export company for damages, following his protest action.

== Awards ==
PILCH has received the following awards in recognition of its work:

- The 2007 Business 3000 Community Responsibility Award
