= Reynold Levy =

American businessperson and author

- Born: April 1945 (age 81); United States
- Education: Columbia Law School
- Occupations: Businessperson, author
- Known for: Former president of Lincoln Center

Reynold Levy is an American businessperson and author. He was president of Lincoln Center for 11 years, overseeing a $1.3 billion overhaul before stepping down in 2013.

Levy served as president of the Robin Hood Foundation from 2015 to 2017.

Among his books are They Told Me Not to Take That Job: Tumult, Betrayal, Heroics, and the Transformation of Lincoln Center.

== Early life and education ==
Reynold Levy is a graduate of Hobart College. He was granted a master's degree and Ph.D. in Government and Foreign Affairs from the University of Virginia in 1973, and that year also received a Juris Doctor degree from Columbia Law School. He has received honorary degrees from Dickinson College, Macaulay Honors College of The City University of New York, and Fordham University.

== Career ==
Levy has served as a consultant to nonprofit institutions and as a senior advisor to the private equity firm General Atlantic.

Levy has held the post of senior lecturer at The Harvard Business School and has taught law, political science, and nonprofit administration at Columbia and New York Universities and at the City University of New York.

He became president of Lincoln Center in 2002. Levy completed a thirteen-year tenure as the president of Lincoln Center for the Performing Arts in January 2014. During Levy's tenure, the Lincoln Center's facilities and programs received $1.2 billion in improvements.

Levy has been president of the International Rescue Committee, the senior officer of AT&T in charge of government relations, president of the AT&T Foundation, executive director of the 92nd Street Y, and staff director of the Task Force on the New York City fiscal crisis.

He has most recently served as the president of the Robin Hood Foundation, a philanthropic organization founded in 1988 to alleviate poverty in New York City. During his tenure, Levy devised the Start by Asking campaign to help enroll New Yorkers in four income maintenance programs.

Reynold serves as a consultant to commercial and nonprofit institutions and to benefactors seeking to expand their philanthropy. He recently served as the lead director of First Republic Bank and is currently a senior advisor to East Rock Capital, a private equity firm. Other clients have included The Poses Foundation, JED, The Foundation for Children with Learning Disabilities, Stephen Ross, chair, Related, The Eva and Andy Grove Foundation, Suffolk Construction, The Peterson Institute for International Economics, and Third Way.

=== Positions ===
Levy serves on the board of the Charles H. Revson Foundation, a member of the board of overseers of the International Rescue Committee, as a member of the Council on Foreign Relations and a Fellow in the American Academy of Arts and Sciences. In 2014, he was elected to serve a three-year term as a member of the Tony Awards Nominating Committee.

Levy has served on the boards of more than a dozen nonprofit organizations including The Independent Sector, The Peterson Institute for International Economics, the Manhattan Theatre Club, the American Ballet Theatre and the Nathan Cummings Foundation.

=== Bibliography ===
Levy has authored five books: Nearing the Crossroads: Contending Approaches to American Foreign Policy (1975, Free Press of MacMillan), Give and Take: A Candid Account of Corporate Philanthropy (1999, Harvard Business School Press), Yours for the Asking: An Indispensable Guide To Fundraising and Management (2008, John Wiley and Sons), They Told Me Not To Take That Job: Tumult, Betrayal, Heroics, and the Transformation of Lincoln Center (2014, Public Affairs), and Start Now: Because That Meaningful Job Is Out There, Just Waiting For You (2020, RosettaBooks).

His fourth book, They Told Me Not To Take That Job: Tumult, Betrayal, Heroics and the Transformation of Lincoln Center, was a New York Times best seller.

He has written extensively and spoken widely about philanthropy, the performing arts, humanitarian causes and issues, and the leadership and management of nonprofit institutions.

== Recognition ==
Levy's alma mater, Hobart College, gave him its Alumni Medal of Excellence. The International Rescue Committee gave him its Freedom Award. Columbia University awarded Levy the Lawrence A. Wien Prize for Social Responsibility. Lincoln Center granted him its Laureate Award.

Levy received the 2009 Design Patron Award granted by the Smithsonian's Cooper-Hewitt Museum for his stewardship of Lincoln Center's physical transformation. In recognition of Lincoln Center's modernization, the board of directors decided to name a sculpturally expressive bridge designed by Diller Scofidio + Renfro as "The President's Bridge: In Honor of Reynold Levy, October 1, 2012."
