= Anna Friederich =

German-Australian governess and science communicator

- Born: Anna Rühl; Greifswald, Germany
- Scientific career
- Fields: Botany

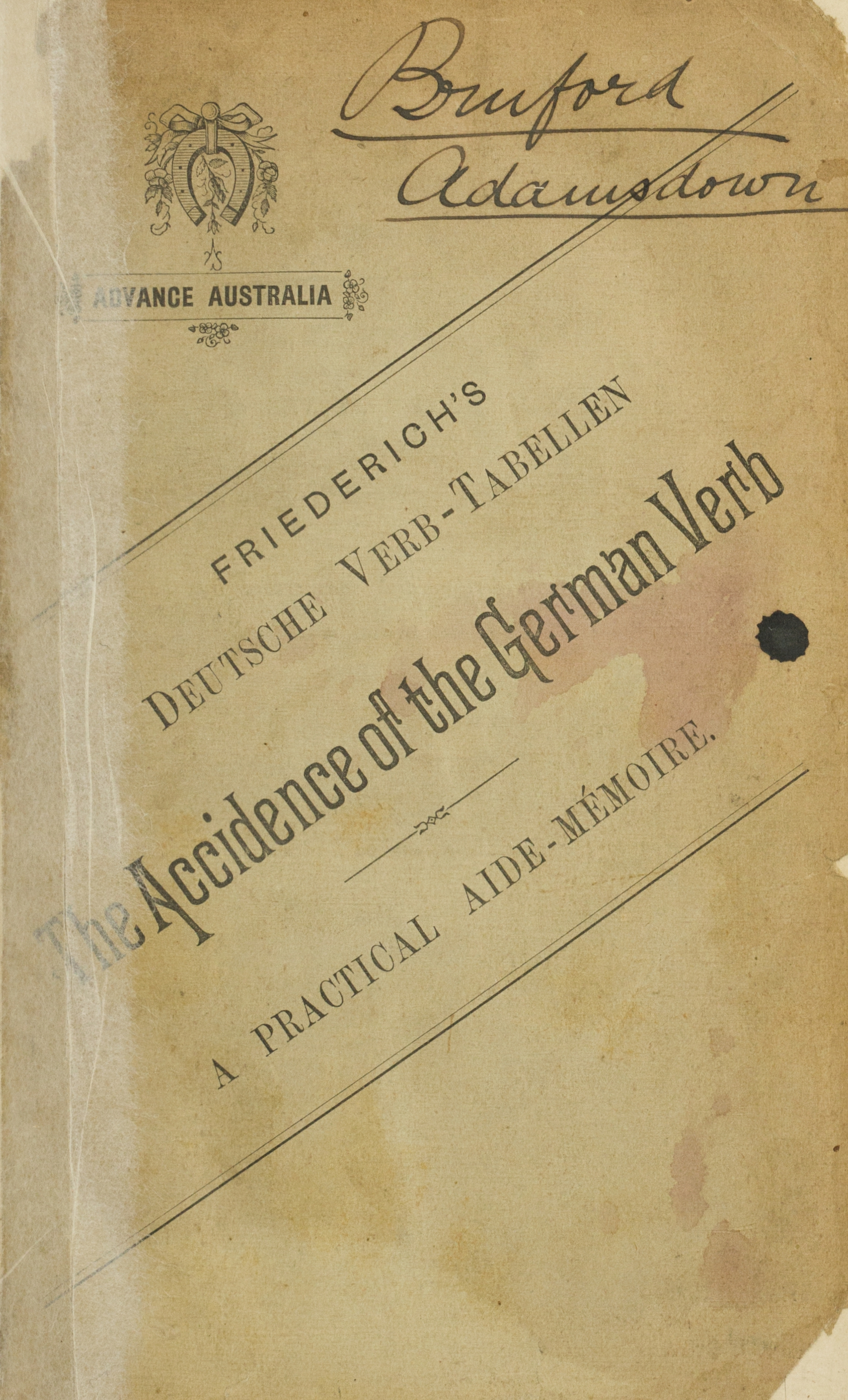
Cover of Deutsche verb-tabellen, 1886. This copy was used at the Adamsdown school for girls in Malvern, Victoria.

Madame Anna Friederich, née Rühl was a governess and naturalist who migrated to Australia in 1885. She was highly active for a decade on the continent as a German-language educator and science communicator for adults and children alike.

== Early life ==
Little of Anna Friederich's life is known before arriving in Australia. She was born in Greifswald, and by 1865 was qualified to work as a governess (Erzieherin) in Prussian Stralsund.

== Work in Australia ==
Friederich arrived in Sydney in 1885 before travelling further on to Melbourne. In October 1886 she passed the matriculation for the University of Melbourne for geography and botany, with first-class honours in French and German, however she was not considered to be a formal candidate.

While she was initially appointed as a teacher at Ruyton Girls' School in Kew, by 1887 she was teaching German at Mrs Adderley's Park Place Ladies School in South Yarra. She also advertised a German literature class at the Melbourne Athenaeum, and her availability as a private tutor. By 1888 she moved to Randwick, Sydney, to teach German at Lachford College. Finally, she taught at the Canargroo School in Bathurst, before returning to Melbourne by 1892.

She was a prolific writer of popular science pieces in newspapers, and member of multiple natural history and scientific organisations in Victoria and New South Wales. These included the Natural History Association of New South Wales (the predecessor of the Field Naturalist's Society in which she also participated), and the Field Naturalists Club of Victoria. She appears in records in 1891 in Bathurst, New South Wales as a member of the Bathurst Science Society, and was elected to the Victorian Branch of the Royal Geographical Society of Australasia in 1892.

She was also associated with the Ministering Children's League in Bathurst, becoming the Canargroo branch's honorary secretary. In 1889 she received the silver humanity medal from the Bands of Mercy.

== Writing and specimen collecting ==
In 1886, as a self-described "professor of languages," she published Friederich's Deutsche Verb-Tabellen: The accidence of the German verb, a practical aide-mémoire with George Robertson & Company (Note: A pamphlet from Madame A. Friederich was received by the Field Naturalists Club of Victoria in 1887, which agrees with the statement in the Australische Zeitung, that she was the author.) (Note: The title page differs from the cover, where the book is titled Deutsche verb-tabellen or the accidence of the German verb : systematically arranged and simplified by A. Friederich, Professor of Languages, for the use of schools, private tuition, and preparation for matriculation. A practical aide-mémoire.)

Friederich's English-language writings appeared in The Sydney Mail and New South Wales Advertiser as part of its reporting on the activities of the Natural History Association from 1888 to 1889, including:

- "Wildflowers and Poets," 1888.
- "Orchids in Australia," part 1 and part 2
- "Mosquitos," 1889.
- "The German Stag," 1889.

And two serialised columns:

- Animal Stories for the Children, 1888 (part 1), (part 2), (part 3), (part 4), (part 5), (part 6)
- Elementary Animal Physiology for Girls and Boys, 1888 (part I), (part II), (part III), (part IV)

In 1888, she donated insect specimens to the Australian Museum. Friederich also collected botanical specimens for Ferdinand von Mueller in New South Wales between 1887 and 1888, of which 46 are still extant and held at the National Herbarium of Victoria, Royal Botanic Gardens Victoria. She also collected plants around Portarlington, Victoria, and exhibited her collections of "pressed flowers" with the Natural History Association.

== Disappearance from Australian records ==
It has been assumed that she left Australia around 1893, as she disappears from records at this time. Other aspects of her life remain unknown.
