= New York Lawyers for the Public Interest =

US non-profit civil rights law firm

New York Lawyers for the Public Interest, Inc. ("New York Lawyers" or "NYLPI" [nil-pee]) is a non-profit civil rights law firm located in New York City, specializing in the areas of disability rights, access to health care and environmental justice.

NYLPI was founded in 1976 by eleven attorneys and nine law firms to meet the legal needs of underserved, underrepresented New Yorkers and their communities. This arrangement ultimately evolved into NYLPI's pro bono clearinghouse, which now matches volunteer lawyers from prestigious law firms and corporate legal departments with community groups and nonprofit organizations in need of legal services.

NYLPI also has a number of in-house staff attorneys, social workers and community organizers working in the organization's three areas of specialization. NYLPI's Disability Justice Program "protects and promotes the civil rights of people with disabilities," its Environmental Justice Program "provides organizing and legal assistance to low-income neighborhoods and communities of color that bear an unfair burden of environmental threats," and its Health Justice Program "works to ensure access to quality health care for people in medically underserved communities or facing barriers due to limited English proficiency, racial and ethnic discrimination, and disability."

NYLPI was once associated with the National Campaign to Restore Civil Rights (NCRCR), "a national collaboration of lawyers, academics, students, community activists, and concerned individuals who have joined together in response to recent federal court decisions that are eroding civil rights protections," but is no longer connected to it.

== Mission ==
NYLPI's mission is to advance equality and civil rights, with a focus on health justice, disability justice, and environmental justice, through the power of community lawyering and partnerships with the private bar.

== History ==
New York Lawyers for the Public Interest originated in proposals submitted to the Association of the Bar of the City of New York in 1973 by its Young Lawyers Committee and the Council of New York Law Associates. Both addressed the need for legal services to organizations serving the public interest. A Subcommittee on Legal Services Programs, appointed by Orville Schell, Jr., President of the Association, and chaired by David Sive, was charged with making appropriate recommendations, and resulting issues were resolved under the Presidency of Cyrus R. Vance in 1975. Vance served as the organization's first chairman and was succeeded by Schell in 1977, when Vance became Secretary of State.

== Founders ==
Founding board members:

- Cyrus R. Vance, chairman;
- Carol Bellamy
- Robert Carswell
- Adrian W. DeWind
- R. Scott Greathead
- Hervey M. Johnson
- Francis T. P. Plimpton
- Frederick A. O. Schwarz, Jr.
- Deborah L. Seidel
- David Sive
- Daniel L. Kurtz, executive director

Founding law firms:

- Chadbourne & Parke
- Cravath, Swaine & Moore
- Debevoise & Plimpton
- Shearman & Sterling
- Simpson Thacher & Bartlett
- Skadden, Arps, Slate, Meagher & Flom
- Willkie Farr & Gallagher
- Winer, Neuberger & Sive
- Winthrop, Stimson, Putnam & Roberts

== See also ==
- Activism
- Civil rights
- Disability rights
- Environmentalism
- Health care
- The New York Foundation
- Pro bono
- Public Interest Law Clearing House, an Australian organization modeled on NYLPI
- Weiquan movement
