= Ross Ray =

Australian lawyer

Ross Ray QC was an Australian barrister and the President of the Law Council of Australia.

Ross Ray studied at Monash University, where he obtained a Bachelor of Jurisprudence and a Bachelor of Laws, graduating in 1975.

He practised in a range of areas and participated in some of Australia's most well known cases. Ray was Chair of the Victorian Bar in 2004 and 2005.

He appeared in many major coronial investigations and Royal Commissions, including the Grand Prix death at Albert Park.

His wife, Mara, is also a Victorian barrister.

Ross Ray died on 22 May 2016 in a quad bike accident at his hobby farm near Mansfield, Victoria.
