= Edward Rosenstein =

American politician

Member of the New York State Assembly from New York County's 12th District
- In office 1903–1905
- Preceded by: Leon Sanders
- Succeeded by: Max Eckmann

Personal details
- Born: August 5, 1864 Atlantic Ocean (on an ocean liner)
- Died: November 26, 1931 (aged 67) Lower East Side, New York City, U.S.
- Resting place: Mount Carmel Cemetery, Queens, New York, U.S.
- Party: Democratic
- Spouse: Anna Rosenstein
- Children: 6, including Melville, Arthur, Robert, Ben, Lillian, Belle
- Occupation: Shoe salesman, saloonkeeper, politician

Edward Rosenstein (August 5, 1864 – November 26, 1931) was a Jewish-American shoe salesman, saloonkeeper, and politician from New York.

== Early life and career ==
Rosenstein was born on August 5, 1864, on an ocean liner that brought his parents to America, near the end of its journey. The family settled on the Lower East Side of Manhattan in New York City, where his father worked as a cobbler.

Rosenstein initially worked as a shoe manufacturer with his father. He later became a salesman, working with L. M. Hirsch for eight years and then with the Surprise Shoe Bazaar for another eight years. Following this, he worked at the Siegel-Cooper Company. In 1898, he was appointed county detective in the New York County District Attorney's office. He resigned in 1902 and returned to the Siegel-Cooper Company.

== Political career ==
In 1902, Rosenstein was elected to the New York State Assembly as a Democrat, representing New York County's 12th District. He served in the Assembly from 1903 to 1905.

== Later life and legacy ==
Before his election to the Assembly, Rosenstein opened a saloon at the corner of Broome and Essex streets. It became one of the most popular saloons on the Lower East Side, leading to his "election" as Mayor of Broome Street with the League of Locality Mayors. He served in this ceremonial role for 35 years, retiring in 1930. Later in life, Rosenstein worked at a bank on the East Side.

Rosenstein was married to Anna. They had six children: Lillian Elson, Belle Kushner, Ben, Arthur, Melville, and Robert. He was Jewish.

Rosenstein died at home from a heart attack on November 26, 1931, after attending Thanksgiving dinner at his son-in-law's home. He was buried in Mount Carmel Cemetery.

New York State Assembly
Preceded by Leon Sanders	New York State Assembly; New York County, 12th District; 1903–1905	Succeeded by Max Eckmann
