= Samuel Silverman =

American lawyer

Samuel Joshua Silverman (25 September 1908 – 6 March 2001) was a three time New York State Supreme Court Justice and career litigator who was involved in several high-profile cases

== Background and early career ==
Born in Odesa, Ukraine (part of Russia at the time), his parents immigrated to New York City while he was still a toddler. Silverman graduated from with distinction from Columbia College in 1928, and earned his law degree from Columbia Law School in 1930. Soon he became an assistant corporation counsel for New York City's government. Shortly thereafter he became a partner at a firm that would become Paul, Weiss, Rifkind, Wharton & Garrison.

During his tenure Silverman represented Dr. J. Robert Oppenheimer, the nuclear physicist, at a 1954 loyalty hearing conducted by a panel of the Atomic Energy Commission. Later, Silverman represented Otto Frank, the father of Anne Frank, in a lawsuit over a proposed stage adaptation of the famous Diary of Anne Frank.

== Later career ==
A Democrat, Silverman was elected to state supreme court in 1962. He served there for four years before in 1966 becoming involved in a highly-public campaign with then-Senator Robert F. Kennedy, egged on by Liberal Party leader Alex Rose, to end patronage corruption in New York's Surrogate Court. Specifically, members of the Democratic and Republican parties were cross endorsing each other's candidates for the court in order to promote individuals who would skim commission from inheritance cases and introduce some of these funds back into the political machine. ("Don't die in the city of New York, don't die--if you want to leave anything to your wife and children," Kennedy exhorted.) Silverman won in a landslide, but his efforts at reform were hindered. In a 1967 constitutional convention Silverman's core proposal to abolish the surrogate court and reassign its jurisdiction to a rotation group of state supreme court justices was defeated. Silverman retired in 1971 from the surrogate court and returned to the state supreme court, frustrated by boredom, and reform failures, particularly frustrated with his hard-line senior colleague S. Samuel DiFalco (who was indicted for corruption charges in 1978, but died before the trial). Silverman was promoted to the Appellate Division in 1976. He remained at the state supreme court until he retired in 1984, when he returned as senior counsel for Paul, Weiss, Rifkind, Wharton & Garrison.

Silverman died at aged 92 at the Weill Cornell Medical Center of New York-Presbyterian Hospital.

== Sources ==
- Saxon, Wolfgang (March 11, 2001). "Samuel J. Silverman, Judge and Litigator, Is Dead at 92". The New York Times.
- Samuels, Dorothy (September 25, 2005). "A Campaign to Remember". The New York Times.
- The Making of the Surrogate, July 8, 1966
- Robert Kennedy and His Times by Arthur M. Schlesinger Jr.
