= Carmen Lucia (union organizer) =

Carmen Lucia (April 2, 1902 – February 19, 1985) was a union organizer in the United States, nicknamed the "Hatter's Fighting Lady".

== Background ==
Carmen Lucia was born on 2 April 1902, in Catanzaro, Italy.

== Career ==
Lucia quit school at the age of 12, saying she "didn't like the teacher," and began working in the Steinbloch garment factory in Rochester, New York at the age of 14. She became more involved with unions over the next 15 years, including the Neckwear Workers Union and Amalgamated Clothing Workers Union. She took support classes from the YWCA, which led to her getting recruited to the Bryn Mawr Summer School for Women Workers in 1927.

Lucia continued her high school education at the Rochester Business Institute, and confronted the union officers at the school with concerns that Italian Americans were not being treated fairly in the workplace. The officers disagreed, and after repeated attempts to convince them otherwise, she quit the school. Soon after that, Louis Fuchs, the President of the Neckwear Workers Union recruited her as an organizer to unionize factories. She was sent to a necktie factory in Connecticut.

Throughout the 1930s, Lucia was jailed and beaten multiple times while organizing protests and strikes. Despite that, she continued to organize unions, and worked to organize the 1934 West Coast waterfront strike in San Francisco. After that strike, she organized workers in San Francisco into the Department Store Workers Union and the Retail Clerks Association. She organized two unions in 1938 and 1941 for dime store workers. She was at the time an organizer for the Cap makers International Union, and had the protesters carry their babies on their shoulders and hand out pamphlets reading "Take our mothers off the streets. Little Children Like to Eat".

In 1944, Lucia moved to Atlanta, where she lived until 1960. She served as a chair on a number of boards, including the Georgia State Federation of Labor.

Lucia retired in 1974, and lived with her family, writing poetry.

== Death ==
Carmen Lucia died age 81 on February 19, 1985, in Rochester, New York.
