= John Digby (judge) =

Australian judge (born 1951)

John Digby (born 19 July 1951) is an Australian lawyer and a judge in the Supreme Court of Victoria, in the Australian state of Victoria.

== Education ==
Digby attended Scotch College, Melbourne from 1959 to 1969. He completed a law degree at Melbourne University and became a barrister in 1979.

== Legal career ==
Digby was appointed a Queen's Counsel in 1993.

Digby served on the Executive of the Victorian Bar Council and as chairman in 2008–2009.

He served as a Director of the Australian Academy of Law from 2009 to 2012 and as President of the Commercial Bar Association of Victoria from 2009 to 2012.

Digby has been a Senior Fellow of the Law school of Melbourne University since 2005. He has lectured in the Masters course in International Construction Law and International Construction Law from 2002 to 2012.

Digby was entitled to practise law in the Australian jurisdictions of Victoria, New South Wales, the Northern Territory, the Australian Capital Territory, Queensland, South Australia, Tasmania and Western Australia. He was also entitled to practice law in Ireland as a barrister of King's Inns.

Digbys built a reputation as a leading commercial barrister specialising in building and construction industry matters. He has appeared in numerous large and complex proceedings and arbitrations across Australia and has worked as an international commercial arbitrator.

Digby was appointed to the Supreme Court of Victoria in 2012, and sits as a judge of the Commercial Court.

== Personal life ==
Digby was awarded a Royal Humane Society Award for Bravery. He has served in the Royal Australian Navy Reserve. He has been a volunteer with the Brotherhood of St Laurence and a foundation supporter and current patron of the non-profit exhibition and theatre space fortyfivedownstairs.
