= United Hebrew Trades =

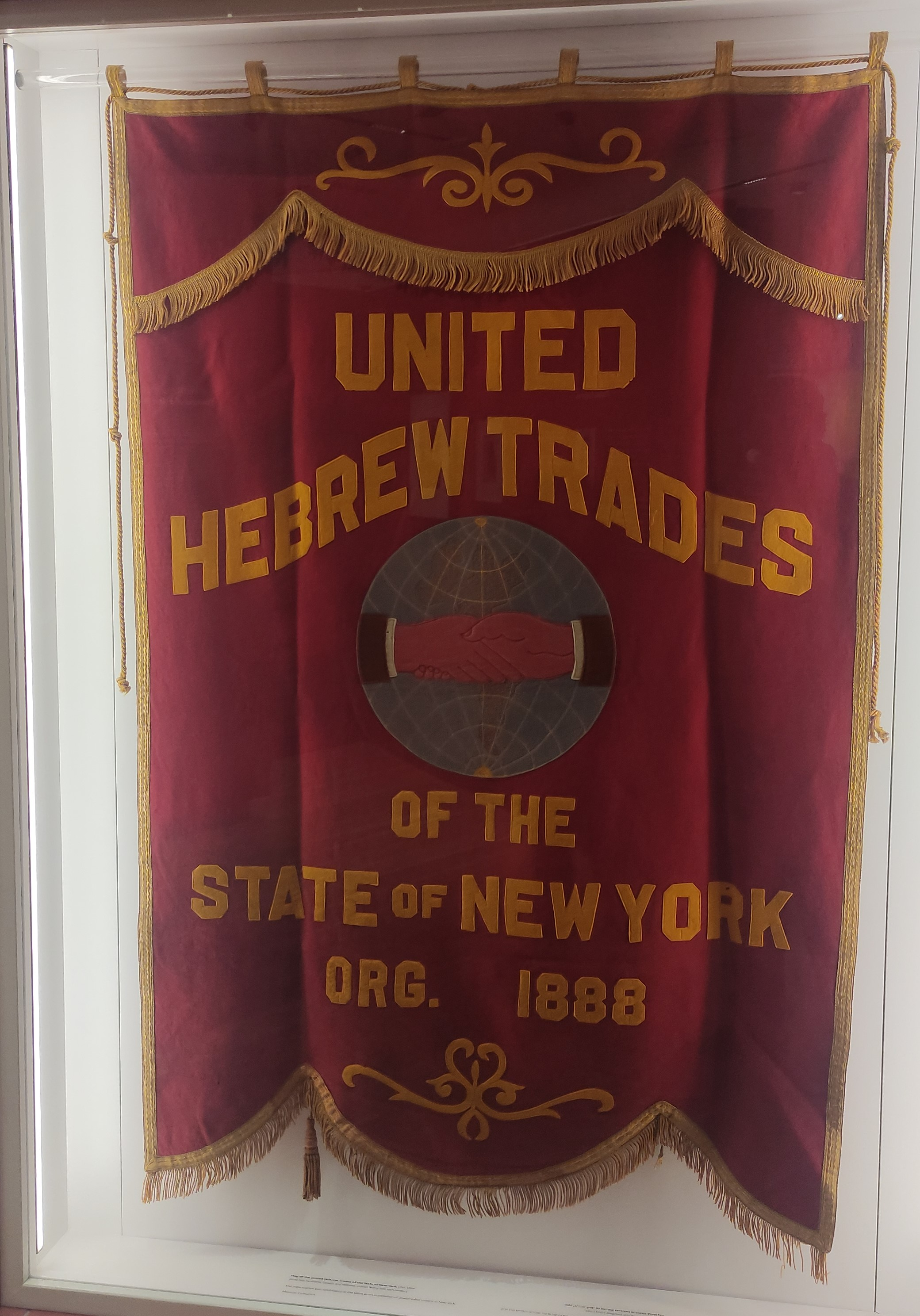
- Founded: 1888
- Headquarters: New York City
- Location: United States

The United Hebrew Trades (Yiddish: Fareynikte Yidishe Geverkshaftn) was an association of Jewish labor unions in New York formed in the late 1880s. The organization was inspired by and modeled upon the United German Trades (German: Deutsche Vereinigte Gewerkschaften), formed decades earlier by German immigrants to the United States who were active in the German, and later the German-American, labor movement.

== Organizational history ==
=== Establishment ===
The United Hebrew Trades (UHT) was organized as a prospective central body of federated trade unions on October 9, 1888, by J. Magidoff, a member of the Yiddish-language Branch 8 of the Socialist Labor Party of America (SLP). The Yiddish Branch of the SLP had been established the previous year and had attracted a number of ambitious and talented young activists to its ranks, including future newspaper publisher Abraham Cahan. This SLP branch would be joined by the Russian-language Branch 17, which included active Jewish radicals Louis Miller, Lev Bandes, and Morris Hillquit, in forming the core of the new trade union organization.

The new organization, the Vereinigte Yiddishe Gewerkschaften (United Hebrew Trades) patterned itself on an earlier trade union organization of German-speaking socialists, the Deutsche Vereignte Gewerkshaften (German United Trades), an organization which dispatched two official delegates to the foundation meeting of the Jewish organization. The gathering was also joined by the editor of the SLP's German-language newspaper, Wilhelm Rosenberg.

Only two tiny unions joined the new Jewish federation at the time of its formation, the typesetters' union and the chorus union — groups with a combined total membership of just 75 people. Despite the organization's tiny size at the time of its establishment, a full slate of officers were elected, with B. Weinstein named secretary and Morris Hillquit chosen as corresponding secretary. Delegates to the German United Trades were also elected.

The United Hebrew Trades rapidly gained recognition by New York unions and by March 1890 the UHT could claim 22 affiliated unions, including sizable organizations of tailors and cloakmakers.

=== DeLeonist interval ===
In 1895, the UHT became a member of the SLP sponsored Socialist Trade and Labor Alliance, becoming "District Alliance 2" in February 1896. Some of its constituent unions, however, were still affiliated with the American Federation of Labor and splintered to become the Federated Hebrew Trades of Greater New York in September 1897. As the ST&LA declined, the UHT disaffiliated in 1899 and merged with the newer federation.

=== Membership growth ===
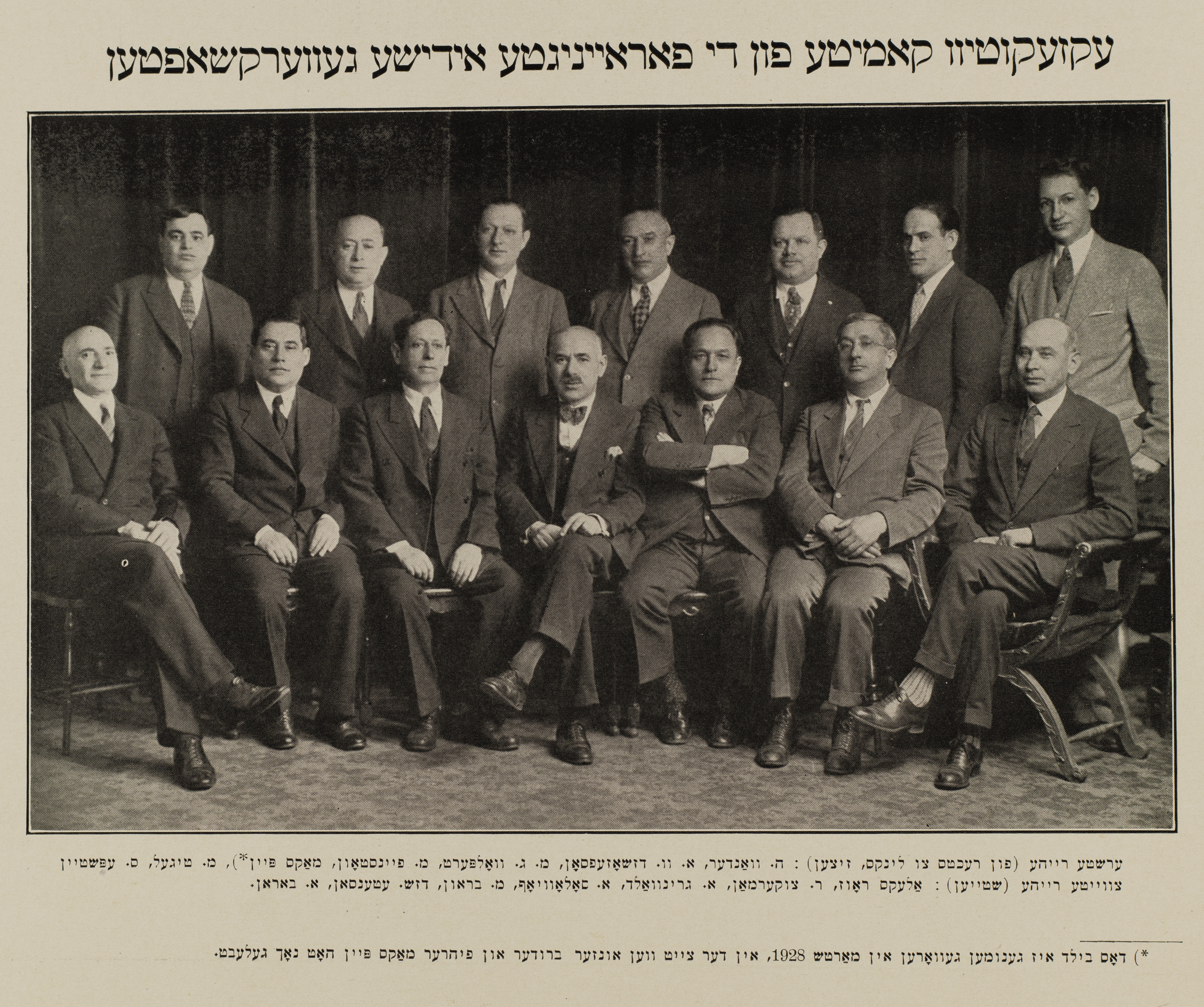
Executive Committee of the United Hebrew Trades, 1928. Seated from left to right: Samuel Epstein, M. Tigel, Max Pine, Morris Feinstone, M. Wolpert, A. Josephson, H. Wander. Standing from left to right: A. Baron, J. Etenson, M. Brown, A. Solovyov, A. Greenwald, W. Zuckerman, Alex Rose.

By 1910, Weinstein was able to report that the UHT had 106 unions under its umbrella, consisting of 150,000 working men and women. In 1914 the UHT celebrated its 25th anniversary in Carnegie Hall. Clarence Darrow and Samuel Gompers were featured speakers at the event.

In May 1915, eight members of the association's Executive Committee were indicted in New York City and charged with hiring gangsters, including Benjamin Fein, to intimidate uncooperative employers. UHT secretary Abraham Shiplacoff told the New York Times that "we are not going to allow the reactionary District Attorney to eat our beloved leaders alive."

By 1922, the UHT represented approximately 200,000 workers.

In 1933, United Hebrew Trades' activists joined with other organizations and trade unions to form the Jewish Labor Committee, which had its founding convention in February 1934. In 1938, when the UHT celebrated its 50th anniversary, it had 250,000 members.

=== Unification with the Jewish Labor Committee ===
In the 1990s, the UHT changed its relationship with the JLC, from that of an independent affiliated organization to the New York Division of the JLC.

== See also ==
- 1904 New York City Rent Strike
- 1918-1920 New York City rent strikes

== Sources ==
- Epstein, Melech (1950). Jewish Labor in USA: An Industrial, Political and Cultural History of the Jewish Labor Movement, 1882-1914. New York: Trade Union Sponsoring Committee.
