= Kate McMillan =

Australian judge

The Honourable Justice Kate McMillan AM

Judge of the Supreme Court of Victoria
- Incumbent
- Assumed office 14 March 2012

Personal details
- Born: May 1953
- Died: December 2025 (aged 72)
- Spouse: Will Summons
- Education: Ruyton Girls' School; University of Melbourne
- Occupation: Judge, lawyer

Cathryn Faye (Kate) McMillan (May 1953 – December 2025) was a judge in the Trial Division of the Supreme Court of Victoria. She formerly worked as a solicitor before becoming a barrister where she was appointed a Senior Counsel.

== Early life and education ==
McMillan attended Ruyton Girls' School in Kew, Victoria where she was Vice Captain, Athletics Captain and a Boarding House Prefect. McMillan studied at the Melbourne Law School where she graduated with a Bachelor of Laws in 1974.

== Career ==
McMillan did her articles with John Ball and was admitted as a solicitor in April 1976. Six months later she went to work at law firm Phillips, Fox & Masel. McMillan became a barrister in 1981 where she spent the majority of her legal career, being appointed Senior Counsel in 2000, practising primarily in commercial litigation. She was on the Bar Ethics Committee for 10 years and was the Chair of the Victorian Bar in 2005–6. McMillan represented, the former wife of Bob Jane in various proceedings following their separation.

=== Supreme Court ===
McMillan was appointed to the Supreme Court of Victoria on 14 March 2012, where she primarily heard matters in the Common Law Division and was the Judge in Charge of the Trusts, Equity and Probate List. On reaching the statutory age, McMillan retired on 31 January 2023. In 2013 McMillan was accused of doing her nails and reading a legal textbook while witnesses were giving evidence in a lengthy trial. McMillan refused an application that she recuse herself due to a reasonable apprehension of bias.

McMillan was posthumously appointed a Member of the Order of Australia in the 2026 King's Birthday Honours in recognition of her "significant service to the judiciary, to the law, and to the community".

== Personal life ==
McMillan was the co-owner with her husband of an Angus beef farm at Kerrie, near Romsey.
