= Law Council of Australia =

- Type: Bar association
- Region served: Australia

The Law Council of Australia, founded in 1933, is an association of law societies and bar associations from the states and territories of Australia, and the peak body representing the legal profession in Australia. The Law Council represents more than 65,000 lawyers across Australia[] and has its national base in Canberra.

== History ==
The Law Council was formed in 1933 to unite the various state legal associations to represent the profession at a national level and at an international level. Gordon Hughes, a former President of the Law Council, has written a book on the Law Council's history titled The Law Council of Australia – the People, the Profession and the Institutions.

== List of presidents ==
List of presidents of the Law Council of Australia:

- 1933: Herbert Mayo
- 1934: Richard Clive Teece
- 1935: John Latham
- 1936: Francis George Villeneuve Smith
- 1937: Richard Teece (2nd term)
- 1938: William Butler
- 1939: Alec McGill
- 1940: Reginald Bonney
- 1941–45: David Maughan
- 1946: Roy McArthur
- 1947: Edward Reynolds
- 1948–49: Robert Vroland
- 1950–51: Harry Alderman
- 1952–53: Garfield Barwick
- 1954–55: Leonard Butts
- 1956–57: Douglas Menzies
- 1958–59: Oscar Negus
- 1960–61: Wilfrid Francis
- 1962–63: John Bruce Piggott
- 1964–65: John Kerr
- 1966–67: Howard Zelling
- 1968–69: Peter Connolly
- 1970–71: Thomas Molomby
- 1972–73: Peter Brinsden
- 1974–75: Kevin O'Leary
- 1976–77: David Ferguson
- 1978: Cedric Thomson
- 1979: John Carlisle Richards
- 1980: Peter Cranswick
- 1981: Donald Mackay
- 1982: Gerry Murphy
- 1983: Ian Temby
- 1984: Cecil Pincus
- 1984–85: Alan Cornell
- 1985–86: Michael Gill
- 1986–87: Daryl Williams
- 1987–88: John Faulks
- 1988–89: Denis Byrne
- 1989–90: Mahla Pearlman
- 1990–91: Alex Chernov
- 1991–92: David Miles
- 1992–93: Robert Meadows
- 1993–94: John Mansfield
- 1994–95: Stuart Fowler
- 1995–96: Michael Phelps
- 1996–97: Peter Short
- 1997–98: Bret Walker
- 1998–99: Fabian Dixon
- 1999–00: Gordon Hughes
- 2000–01: Anne Trimmer
- 2001–02: Tony Abbott
- 2002–03: Ron Heinrich
- 2003–04: Bob Gotterson
- 2004–05: Stephen Southwood
- 2005–06: John North
- 2006–07: Tim Bugg
- 2007–08: Ross Ray
- 2009: John Corcoran
- 2010: Glenn Ferguson
- 2011: Alexander Ward
- 2012: Catherine Gale
- 2013: Joseph Catanzariti
- 2014: Michael Colbran
- 2015: Duncan McConnel
- 2016: Stuart Clark
- 2017: Fiona McLeod
- 2018: Morry Bailes
- 2019: Arthur Moses
- 2020: Pauline Wright
