= United Hatters of North America =

Former trade union of the United States

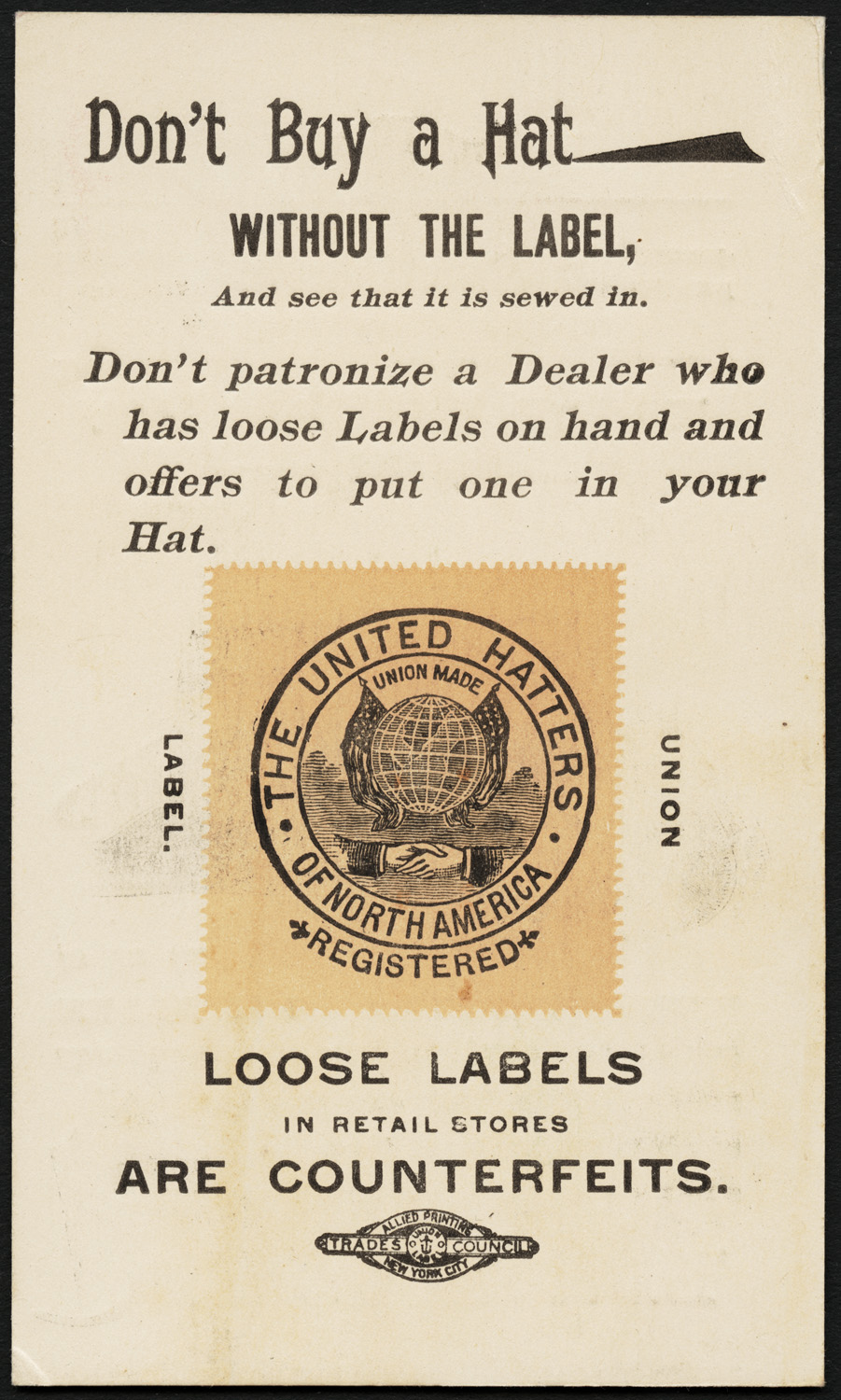
19th Century American Advertising card

The United Hatters of North America (UHU) was a labor union representing hat makers, headquartered in the United States.

== History ==
The UHU was founded and received a charter in the American Federation of Labor in 1896 through a merger of the International Trade Association of Hat Finishers of America and the National Hat Makers' Association of the United States. One of its co-founders was John A. Moffitt, who served consecutively as UHU vice president, president, and editor of its official journal from 1896 to 1911.

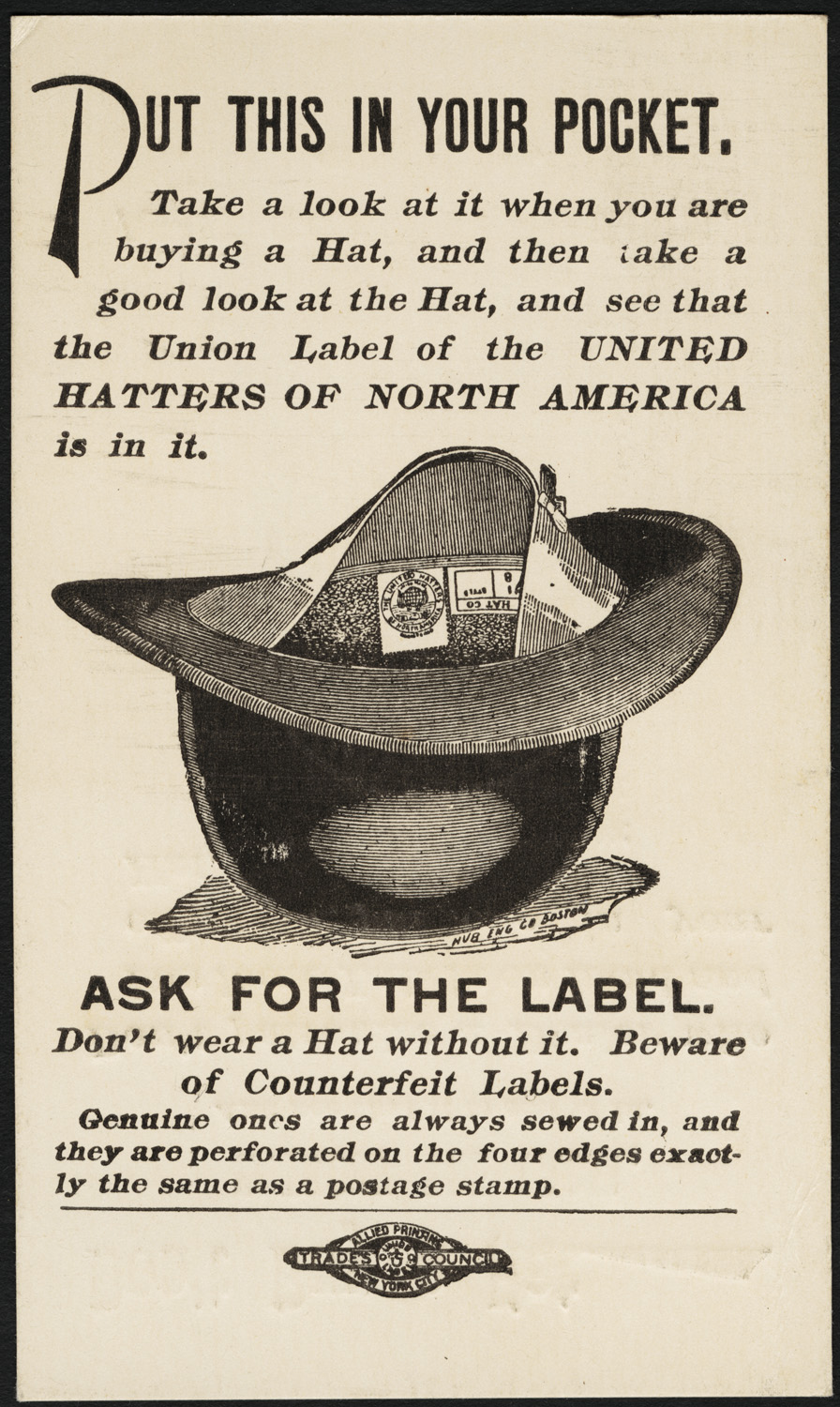
"Ask for the label" advertising card

In 1934, the UHU merged with the Cloth Hat, Cap and Millinery Workers International Union to form the United Hatters, Cap and Millinery Workers International Union (UHCMW), a founding member of the Committee for Industrial Organizations. Subsequent mergers led to the formation of the Amalgamated Clothing and Textile Workers Union (ACTWU) in 1983, and the Union of Needletrades, Industrial and Textile Employees (UNITE) in 1995.

The UHU was the de facto defendant in the landmark 1908 United States Supreme Court Loewe v. Lawlor decision, which was found adversely for the UHU and, by extension, for all unions in the United States. Loewe v. Lawlor outlawed secondary boycotts and ruled that individual union members could be held personally liable for damages incurred by their union.

== Leadership ==
=== Presidents ===
1896: Frederick W. Schmalz
1898: John A. Moffit
1911: Simon Blake
1914: John W. Sculley
1918: Michael F. Greene

=== Secretary-Treasurers ===
1896: John Phillips
1904: Martin Lawlor
