= Wolfson family =

British Jewish family known for political and philanthropic activity

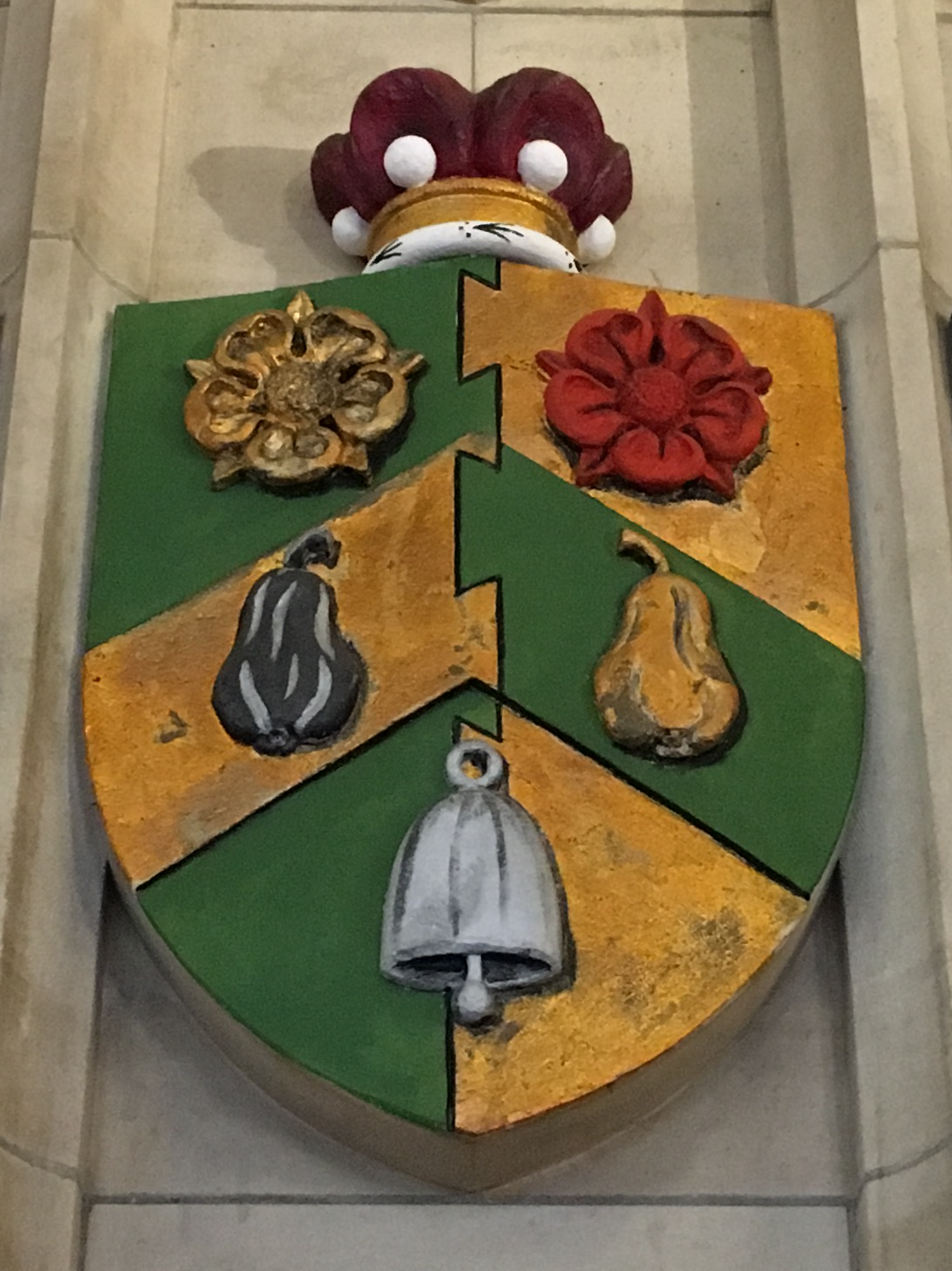
The coat of arms of Leonard Wolfson, Baron Wolfson

The Wolfson family is a British Jewish family known for its business, philanthropic, and political activities. The family owes its initial fame to Sir Isaac Wolfson, who built the Great Universal Stores retail empire and created the Wolfson Foundation.

The family is of Polish-Jewish and Russian-Jewish ancestry and has branches in the U.K., the U.S., and Israel. The original family business, GUS, was eventually demerged into Home Retail Group, which included Argos and Homebase, and credit company Experian. Other businesses led or controlled by family members include the retailers Burberry and Next, and the pharmaceutical company Shaklee.

== History ==
Family patriarch Solomon Wolfson immigrated from Białystok to Glasgow, Scotland, with his wife Nechi (née Wilamowski) at the end of the 19th century. He was a furniture maker and Jewish community leader, later appointed Justice of the Peace. His son Isaac Wolfson built the family retail business and founded the Wolfson Foundation and the Wolfson Family Charitable Trust. Isaac was joined at GUS by his brother Charles Wolfson and later succeeded by his son Leonard Wolfson, and his nephews David Wolfson and Victor Barnett. By World War II the family was based in London, with the Samuel Wolfson branch having moved to Israel. During the Blitz, Solomon's daughter Edith took many of the family children (the third generation) to seek refuge in the United States for the duration of the war. After World War II various family members moved permanently to New York. Today, family members live in London, New York, and Israel.

== Philanthropy ==
Arms of Wolfson College, Oxford

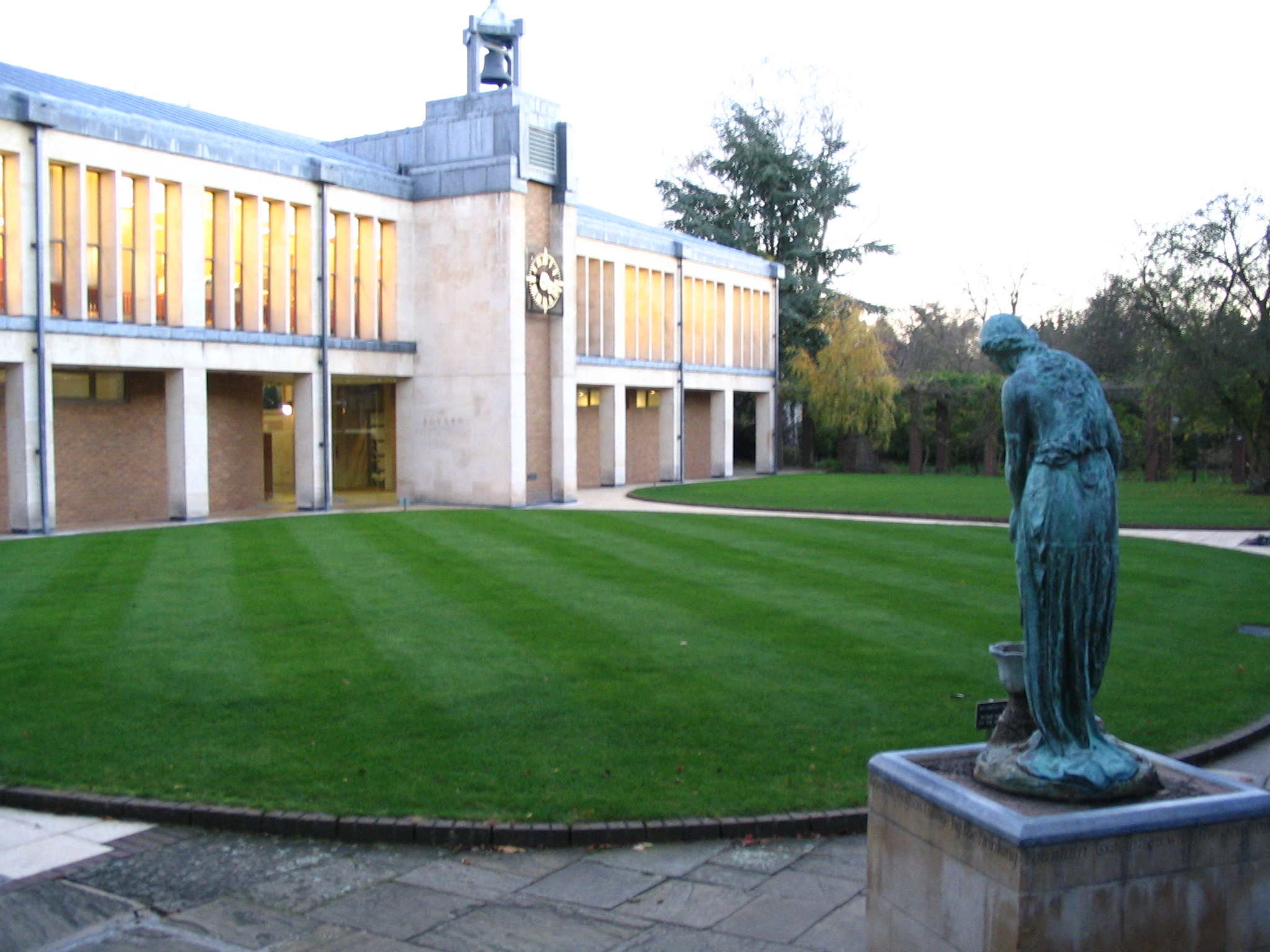
Wolfson College, Cambridge

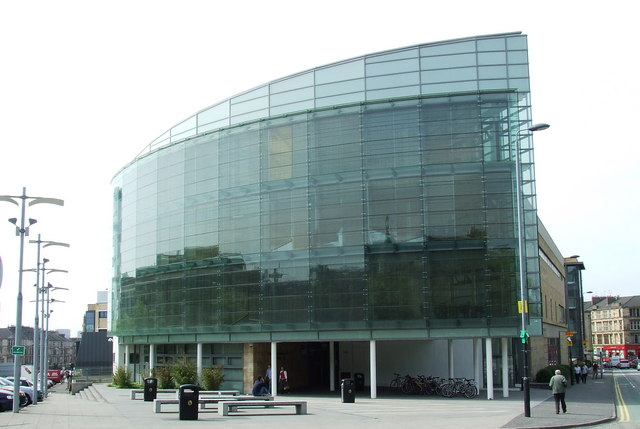
Wolfson Medical School

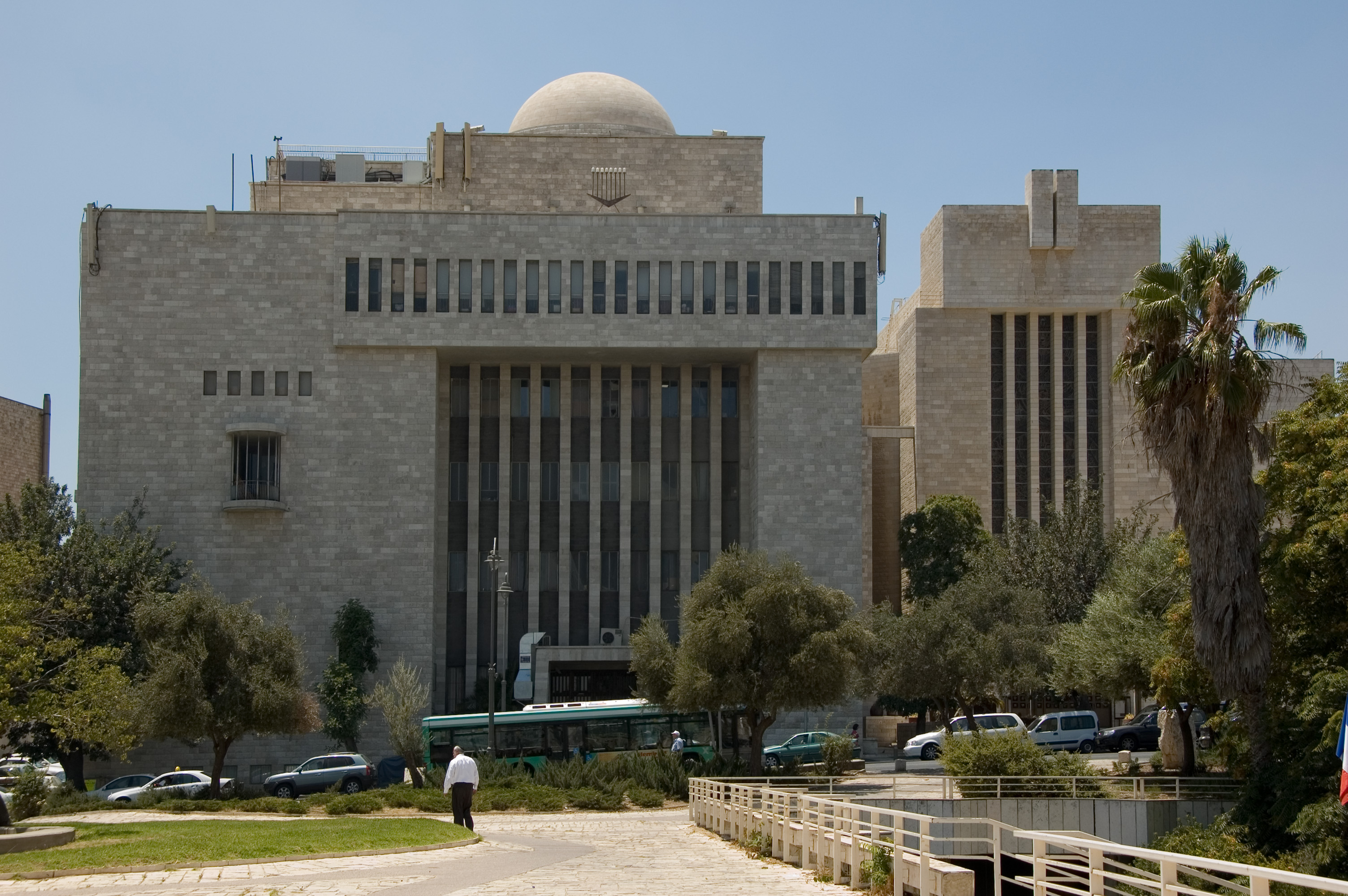
Heichal Shlomo and the Great Synagogue (Jerusalem)

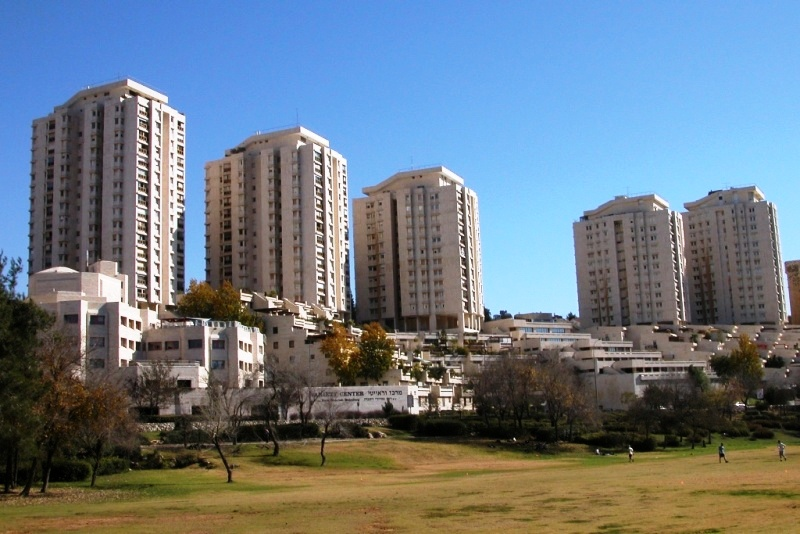
Kiryat Wolfson, Jerusalem

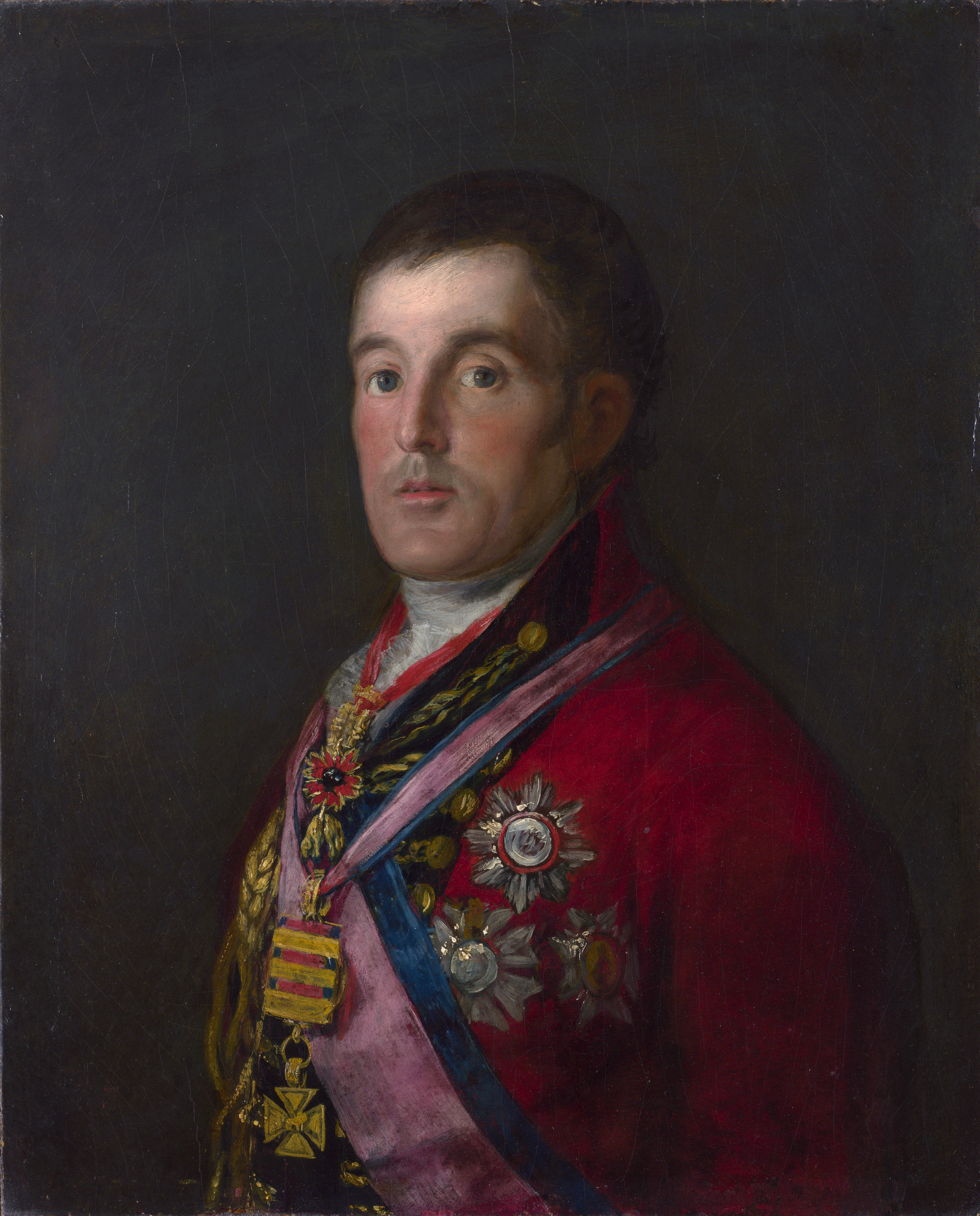
Portrait of the Duke of Wellington, purchased for the National Gallery by the Wolfson Foundation

A family descended from devout Orthodox Jews, the Wolfsons followed the religious and charitable example of their patriarch Solomon and the middle-European community from which he came. Isaac Wolfson is quoted as having said, "No man should have more than £100,000. The rest should go to charity." The Wolfson Foundation was established in 1955, endowed with shares in the family businesses, to support and promote excellence in education, science & medicine, the arts & humanities, and health & disability. The Foundation has awarded over £900 million (£1.9 billion in real terms) in grants to more than 11,000 projects throughout the U.K., including the founding endowments for Wolfson College, Oxford and Wolfson College, Cambridge. The Foundation also operates the Wolfson History Prize. The Wolfson Economics Prize is individually sponsored by Simon Wolfson.

Through the Wolfson Family Charitable Trust and various forms of personal giving, the family have also been among Israel's earliest and most significant supporters, as well as major supporters of Jewish life in Britain and New York. In Israel, the Charitable Trust has been a primary supporter of the Weizmann Institute, the Kiryat Wolfson developments, Heichal Shlomo and the Great Synagogue in Jerusalem, and Wolfson Medical Center in Tel Aviv, among many other projects. Family members were also founding benefactors of Bar Ilan University and The Israel Museum, as well as Lincoln Square Synagogue and Fifth Avenue Synagogue in New York.

== Titles and honours ==
Created in 1962, the Wolfson Baronetcy was one of the last baronetcies and among the last non-royal hereditary titles created in the United Kingdom. In addition, three family members have been created life peers as Lord Wolfson, and many family members and their spouses have received honours for their charitable services.

== Family tree ==
- Solomon Wolfson J.P. (1868–1941), immigrated from Polish-Russia to Scotland, he is the namesake of Heichal Shlomo; m. Nechi Williamowsky/Wilamowski
  - Samuel Wolfson (1896–1973), emigrated to Israel
    - Rabbi Aviezer Wolfson
  - Sir Isaac Wolfson, 1st Baronet (1897–1991), m. Edith Specterman
    - Leonard Wolfson, Baron Wolfson (1927–2010), succeeded his father as chairman of GUS and the Wolfson Foundation; m. Ruth Sterling and had four children and then married to Estelle Jackson
      - Dame Janet Wolfson de Botton (1952–), art collector and philanthropist; m. Michael Green and then Gilbert de Botton
        - Rebecca Green (1974–)
        - Catherine Green (1976–)
      - Hon. Laura Wolfson (1954–), chairman of the Wolfson Family Charitable Trust; m. Barry Townsley
        - Alexandra Townsley (1977–)
        - Georgina Townsley (1979–)
        - Charles Townsley (1984–)
        - Isabella Townsley (1994–)
      - Hon. Deborah Wolfson Davis (1959–), screenwriter of The Favourite; m. Glen Davis
      - Hon. Elizabeth Wolfson (1966–), m. Daniel Peltz OBE
        - Max Peltz
        - Francesca Peltz (1992–)
  - Charles Wolfson (1899–1970), president and later chairman of G.U.S. Canada; m. Hylda Jarvis
    - Jane Wolfson, international board chairman of Bar-Ilan University; m. Jerome Stern and then Dr. Don Lebell
    - David Wolfson, Baron Wolfson of Sunningdale (1935–2021), chief of staff to Margaret Thatcher and the third Wolfson family chairman of GUS; m. Baroness Rawlings (they divorced with no children) and then Susan Davis
      - Simon Wolfson, Baron Wolfson of Aspley Guise (1967–), chief executive of Next and founder of the Wolfson Economics Prize; m. Eleanor Shawcross, economic advisor to George Osborne and daughter of biographer William Shawcross
        - Hon. Samuel Wolfson
      - Hon. Andrew Wolfson (1969–)
        - Lily Wolfson (2007–)
      - Hon. Deborah Wolfson (1973–)
  - Jeannie Wolfson (1901–1974), m. Max Williams
  - Edith Wolfson (1902–1997), m. Esmond Barnett of London and then Ralph Hyman of New York
    - Adele Barnett (1931–2023), m. Howard Suslak, president of McDonald & Co.
    - Victor Barnett (1933–2024), chairman of Burberry, executive director of GUS and Experian; m. Helaine M. Barnett
      - Craig Barnett (1962–), Wall Street investment banker; m. Jennifer Peck, daughter of investor and philanthropist Stephen M. Peck
        - Gabriel Barnett
      - Roger Barnett (1964–), CEO of Shaklee; m. Sloan Lindemann, daughter of businessman George Lindemann Sr.
        - Spencer Barnett (2000–)
  - Rose Wolfson (1904–2003), m. Samuel Martyn of London
    - Herman Martyn MBE
      - Richard Martyn
      - Mark Martyn
      - Lee Martyn
    - Marlene Martyn
  - Eva Wolfson, m. Samuel Gerber
  - Esther Wolfson, m. Joe Levy
  - Bette Wolfson (1911–1993), m. Harold Schapiro of New York
    - Stuart Schapiro
    - Gerald Schapiro
  - Dolly Wolfson (1913–1999), m. Joe Jacobson and then Robert Raisler of New York
    - Steven Jacobson (1944–), m. Lynn Kaplan
      - J. Joseph Jacobson (1970–), m. Jordana Matthews
        - Jonas Jacobson (2003–)
        - Matthew Jacobson (2005–)
      - Anthony Jacobson (1974–)
  - Hannah "Bebe" Wolfson, Lady Foley (1917–2015), m. Jack Steinberg of London and then Adrian Foley, 8th Baron Foley
    - Raymonde Steinberg, m. Ian Jay
    - Kathrine Steinberg, m. Baron Jean-Louis de Gunzburg, a great-great-grandson of the first Baron Günzburg

== See also ==
- UCL Wolfson Institute
- Wolfson Medical School
- Wolfson Stadium, South Africa
- Wolfson Research Exchange
- Wolfson Centre for Magnetics
- Wolfson Molecular Imaging Centre
- Wolfson Neurorehabilitation Centre
- Wolfson Centre for Age-Related Diseases
- Wolfson Brain Imaging Centre
- Wolfson Institute of Preventive Medicine
- Royal Society Wolfson Fellowship
