= Botton =

Botton may refer to:

- Botton, North Yorkshire, England
- Botton, namesake of Bottiaea

== People with the name ==
- Amber de Botton, former Director of Communications at 10 Downing Street
- Alain de Botton, a writer, philosopher, and television personality, son of Gilbert de Botton
- Gilbert de Botton, an entrepreneur and investor
- Janet de Botton, a bridge player and philanthropist, second wife of Gilbert de Botton
- Miel de Botton, a Swiss art collector and philanthropist, daughter of Gilbert de Botton
- Frédéric Botton, French lyricist and composer
