= Wolfson baronets =

Extinct baronetcy in the Baronetage of the United Kingdom

The Wolfson Baronetcy, of St. Marylebone in the City of Westminster, was one of the last baronetcies created in the Baronetcy of the United Kingdom. It was created on 19 February 1962 for Isaac Wolfson, the businessman and philanthropist who established the Wolfson Foundation. In 1985, the 2nd Baronet, Leonard Wolfson, became a life peer as Baron Wolfson, of Marylebone in the City of Westminster.

== Wolfson baronets, of St Marylebone ==
- Sir Isaac Wolfson, 1st Baronet (1897–1991)
- Sir Leonard Gordon Wolfson, 2nd Baronet (1927–2010)

== See also ==
- David Wolfson, another member of the Wolfson family.
- Great Universal Stores (now GUS plc), where Isaac, Leonard and David Wolfson were chairmen in succession.
- Wolfson family
