= Victor Barnett =

British-American businessman (1933–2024)

- Born: Victor Jules Barnett; 1933; London, England
- Died: September 20, 2024 (aged 91)
- Education: Horace Mann School; Wharton School of Business
- Occupation: Businessman
- Known for: Chairman of Burberry
- Spouse: Helaine Meresman (m. 1959)
- Children: 2

Victor Jules Barnett (1933 – September 20, 2024) was a British-American businessman, executive chairman of Burberry, and member of the Wolfson family.

== Early life and education ==
Victor Jules Barnett was born in London, England, in 1933 to Esmond Barnett and Edith Wolfson Barnett. His father died young, leaving Barnett to be raised by his mother and her siblings, among them Sir Isaac Wolfson. Moving to New York City after World War II, Barnett graduated from the Horace Mann School and with a bachelor's degree in economics from the Wharton School of Business at the University of Pennsylvania.

== Career ==
Barnett began his career managing what was then the fledgling American operation of Burberry, a subsidiary of his family's retail conglomerate Great Universal Stores (GUS). He joined Revlon, Inc. in 1961, serving as executive vice president under Charles Revson until 1976. Barnett then returned to help manage the family business, GUS, joining his cousins Leonard and David Wolfson on the group's board of directors and executive committee. As head of GUS in North America, Barnett led the acquisition and growth of credit agency Experian in 1996.

In 1997, he became executive chairman of Burberry to reinvigorate the house's neglected management. At Burberry, Barnett led a reorganization of the company, hiring Rose Marie Bravo as chief executive, renegotiating deals with Burberry's Japanese licensees, acquiring their licensee in Spain, and driving major real estate purchases including its flagship stores on New Bond Street and East 57th Street. Over Barnett's tenure Burberry's operating profits more than quadrupled and the brand became recognized as a global luxury fashion house. In January 2001, Burberry started to look for a replacement for Barnett. In July 2001, Barnett stepped down as chairman of Burberry.

The family took Burberry public in 2002, and demerged GUS into Home Retail Group and Experian in 2006. Following his retirement from GUS and Burberry, Barnett bought pharmaceutical company Shaklee with his younger son Roger and joined the board of Grey Global Group.

== Personal life ==
Barnett was married to Helaine M. Barnett, a legal aid attorney and former president of the Legal Services Corporation. They had two sons, Craig Edward, an investment banker, and Roger Lawrence, CEO of Shaklee.

In 1999, he co-sponsored with Elie Wiesel and James Wolfensohn a full-page ad in the New York Times in which cardinal John Joseph O'Connor (Archbishop of New York) made public apologies for the harm inflicted by the Roman Catholics to Jews during the past two millennials.

Barnett died at home on September 20, 2024, at the age of 91.

== See also ==
- Leonard Wolfson, Baron Wolfson, his cousin
- David Wolfson, Baron Wolfson of Sunningdale, his cousin
