= Janet Wolfson de Botton =

British art collector and philanthropist

The Honourable Dame Janet Wolfson de Botton DBE
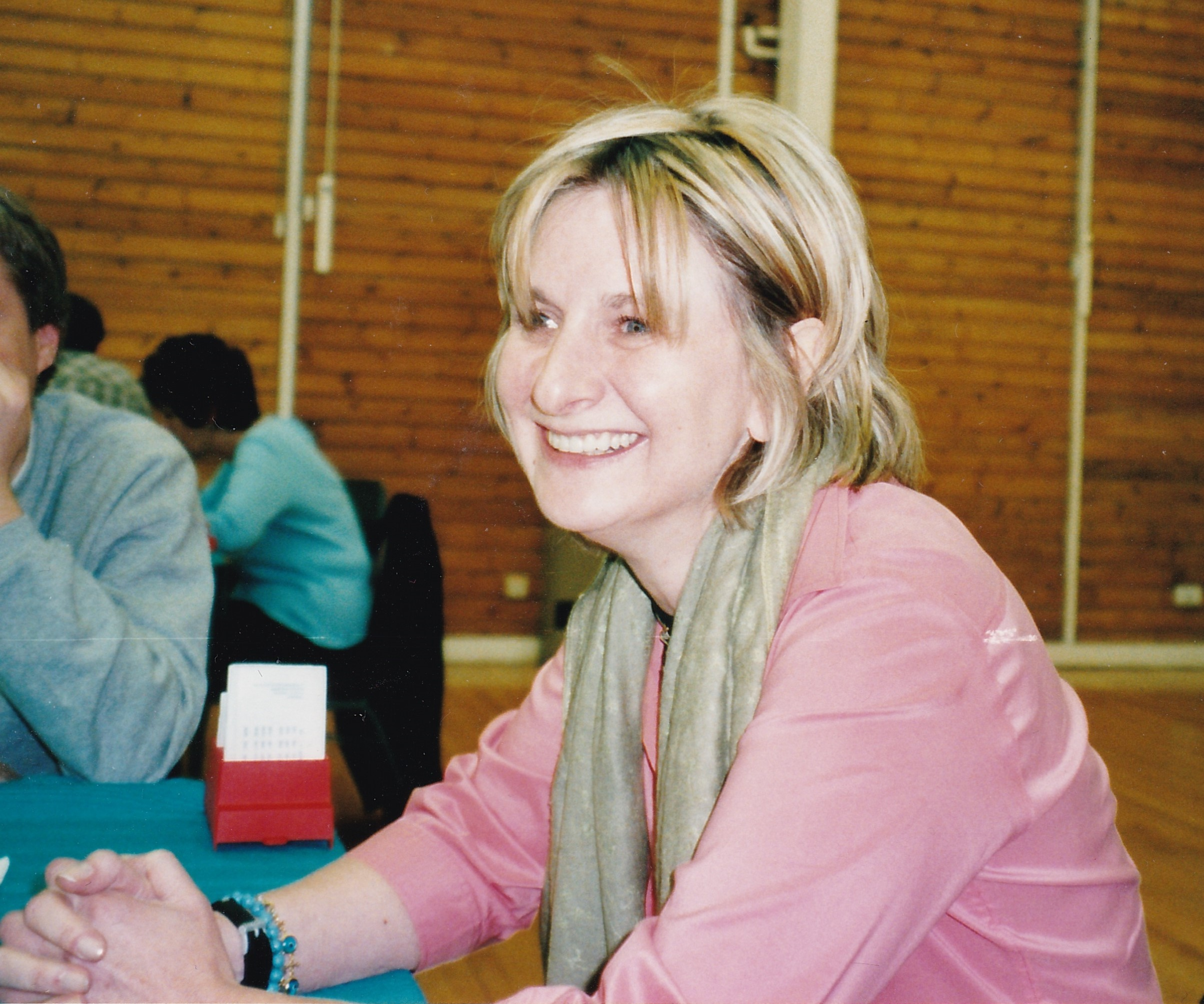
- Wolfson de Botton in 2000
- Born: Janet Frances Wolfson
- Other name: Janet Green
- Occupations: art collector; philanthropist
- Spouse: Michael P. Green (m. 1972; div. 1989) Gilbert de Botton (m. 1990; death 2000)
- Parents: Leonard Wolfson, Baron Wolfson (father); Ruth Sterling (mother)
- Relatives: Sir Isaac Wolfson, 1st Baronet (grandfather)

Dame Janet Frances de Botton (née Wolfson; formerly Green) is a British art collector and philanthropist.

== Family ==
Janet de Botton is the eldest daughter of Leonard Wolfson, Baron Wolfson and his wife Ruth (née Sterling), who married in 1949, and a granddaughter of Sir Isaac Wolfson, 1st Baronet, founder of the Great Universal Stores family; she was previously married to the broadcasting executive Michael Green.

Her husband, Swiss financier Gilbert de Botton, sold Global Asset Management for £234 million in 1999.

== Career ==
De Botton has been a trustee of Tate and Chairman of the Council of Tate Modern. In June 2010, the Wolfson Foundation announced the appointment of de Botton as the new chairperson, following a unanimous decision by the trustees.

== Philanthropy ==
De Botton is a prominent collector of modern art.

In 1996, she presented 60 works of art to the Tate, including examples by Carl Andre, Richard Artschwager, Gilbert & George, Richard Long, Cindy Sherman, Roni Horn, Gary Hume, Nancy Spero, Andy Warhol and Bill Woodrow.

In 2010, she donated a ceiling painting by Twombly to the Louvre's Salle de Bronzes.

According to the Sunday Times Giving List in 2020, de Botton gave £65.1 million to charitable causes in 2019.

== Distinctions ==
- 2006: Commander of the Most Excellent Order of the British Empire (CBE)
- 2013: Dame Commander of the Order of the British Empire (DBE)

== Fortune ==
In 2007, she appeared at number 22 (down from number 18, in 2006) in the Sunday Times Rich List, with an estimated personal fortune of £285 million.

== Other activities ==
Wolfson is a keen player of the card game bridge.

== See also ==
- Wolfson family
