= Lord Wolfson =

Lord Wolfson may refer to:

- Leonard Wolfson, Baron Wolfson (1927–2010), British businessman
- David Wolfson, Baron Wolfson of Sunningdale (1935–2021), British politician and businessman
- Simon Wolfson, Baron Wolfson of Aspley Guise (born 1967), British businessman
- David Wolfson, Baron Wolfson of Tredegar (born 1968), British barrister and politician
