= Gilbert de Botton =

Egyptian-Israeli-Swiss financial pioneer (1935–2000)

- ז'ילבר דה בוטון
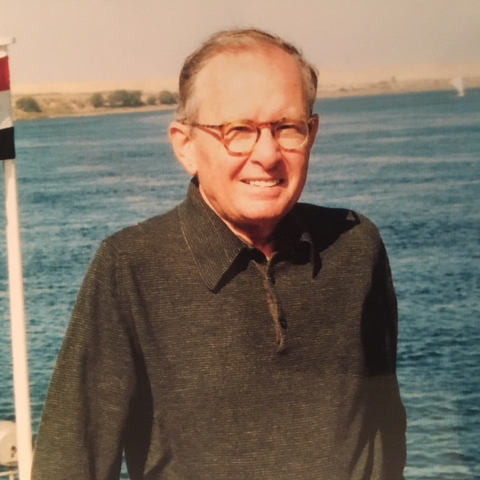
- Gilbert de Botton on holiday
- Born: 16 February 1935; Alexandria, Egypt
- Died: 27 August 2000 (aged 65); Paradou, France
- Citizenship: Swiss
- Education: Victoria College, Alexandria
- Alma mater: Hebrew University of Jerusalem; Columbia University
- Occupation: Financier
- Known for: Founder, Global Asset Management
- Spouses: Jacqueline Burgauer (1962–1988); Janet Green (1990–2000)
- Children: Alain de Botton; Miel de Botton
- Parent(s): Jacques de Botton; Yolande Harmer
- Relatives: Leonard Wolfson, Baron Wolfson (father-in-law)

Gilbert de Botton (Hebrew: ז'ילבר דה בוטון; 16 February 1935 – 27 August 2000) was an Egyptian-Israeli-Swiss financial pioneer, who is considered the inventor of the open architecture model of asset management, whereby a financial institution offers third-party products to their clients. He was also a prominent art collector.

== Early life ==
Gilbert de Botton was born in Alexandria, Egypt, to a distinguished Sephardic Jewish family. Among his ancestors was the rabbinical scholar Abraham de Boton. Gilbert was brought up largely by his mother's parents. His mother Yolande Harmer, a journalist and Israeli intelligence officer, died in 1959. He also saw little of his father, who was an oil company representative.

De Botton was educated at Victoria College, Alexandria; the Hebrew University of Jerusalem, where he studied economics; and Columbia University in the US, where he earned a master's degree.

== Career ==
In 1968, when the British and French Rothschild banking houses decided jointly to establish an operation in Zurich, de Botton was recruited as its first managing director. He went on to serve briefly as president of Rothschilds in New York in 1982.

In 1983, Gilbert de Botton founded the Global Asset Management financial firm, a multinational asset management firm, later incorporated into UBS AG until December 2005, when it was acquired by Julius Baer. Upon selling his stakes in the company in 1999, de Botton received a large sum of money, whose size has never been officially confirmed by buyer or seller. His wealth was estimated by one source to have reached £234 million in 1999 (equivalent to £448,000,000 in 2025).

== Legacy ==
In 2003, GAM and the London School of Economics and Political Science (LSE) announced the creation of the GAM Gilbert de Botton Award in Finance Research, an annual award given in recognition of outstanding research in finance, in honour of Gilbert de Botton.

He was also known as a scholar of Montaigne; his collection of books now comprises "The Montaigne Library" at the Cambridge University Library in the UK.

== Personal life ==
Gilbert de Botton married Jacqueline Burgauer in 1962. The marriage was dissolved in 1988. They had two children: a son, the writer Alain de Botton, and a daughter, Miel de Botton, a philanthropist and art collector. In 1990, he married Janet Green (née Wolfson), the eldest daughter of businessman Leonard Wolfson, Baron Wolfson, of the Great Universal Stores family, and previously married to broadcasting executive Michael Green. Janet de Botton is also a prominent collector of modern art.
