= Wolfson Medical Center =

Hospital in Holon, Israel

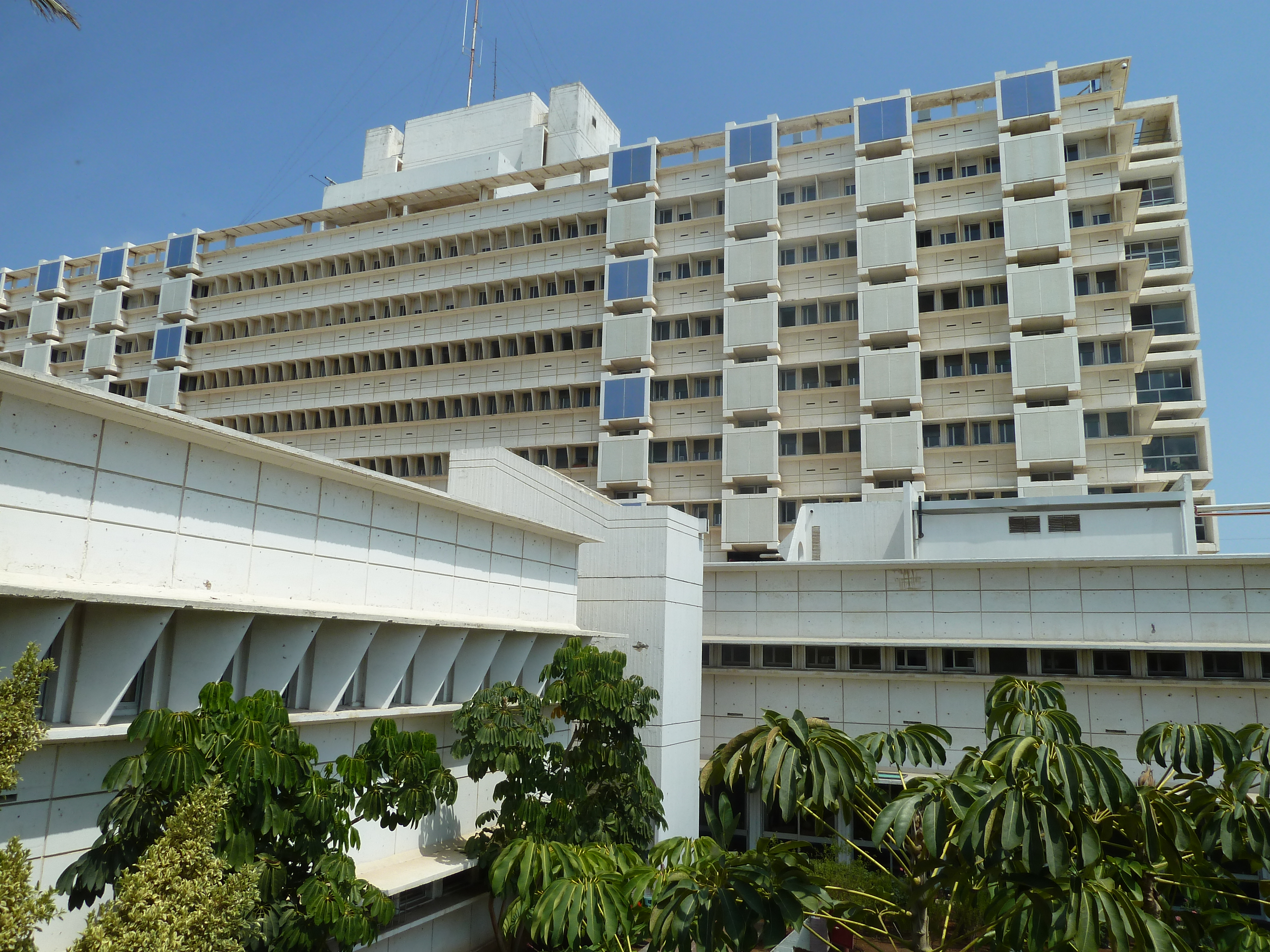
- Wolfson Medical Center

Geography
- Location: Holon, Tel Aviv District, Israel
- Coordinates: 32°02′07″N 34°45′47″E

Organisation
- Affiliated university: Tel Aviv University

Services
- Beds: 650

History
- Opened: 1980

Wolfson Medical Center (Hebrew: מרכז רפואי וולפסון) (transliteration: Merkaz Refui Wolfson) is a hospital in the Tel Aviv District city of Holon, Israel. Wolfson Hospital is located in southern Tel Aviv Metropolitan Area in a vicinity abounded by a population of nearly half a million inhabitants. It ranks as the ninth largest hospital in Israel. The medical center was founded with the assistance of the Wolfson Foundation and named after Lady Edith Specterman Wolfson, Sir Isaac Wolfson's wife.

== History ==
The medical center in Holon was opened to the public in 1980 on the southern Tel Aviv border. The center has grown since from 342 beds to over 650 beds in 2007 with an additional 30 outpatient beds.

== Services ==
The Wolfson Medical Center departments are affiliated with the Sackler School of Medicine, Tel Aviv University and tutors students during their intern years. The center employs over 100 doctors that also hold posts, ranging from instructors to professors, at the university. The students come also from United States, UK, China, Italy, Ethiopia, Ghana, Ecuador, Bulgaria, Honduras and Georgia. The Medical Center regularly publishes academic articles in local and foreign journals.

== See also ==
- Health care in Israel
- List of hospitals in Israel
- Wolfson family
