= Wolfson Molecular Imaging Centre =

Imaging Centre

Coordinates: 53°25′51″N 2°13′52″W

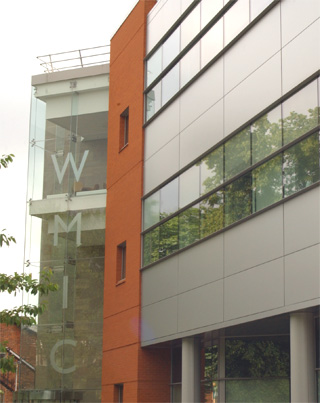
Exterior of the Wolfson Molecular Imaging Centre.

The University of Manchester Wolfson Molecular Imaging Centre (WMIC) is a purpose-built molecular imaging research facility. Based on the site of the Christie Hospital in Manchester, the Centre aims to develop clinical research and development in medical imaging in areas of oncology, neuroscience and psychiatry research.

== Facilities and equipment ==
The centre is equipped with cyclotron and radiochemistry facilities including: a hot cell laboratory, 2 advanced high-resolution PET scanners, supporting chemical analysis laboratories and data analysis facilities. There is also a 1.5T MRI scanner in the centre.

The Wolfson Molecular Imaging Centre is part of the Imaging Facilities of the University of Manchester. The Imaging Facilities also own a 3T MRI scanner at the Manchester Clinical Research Facility and in 2015 a GE SIGNA PET-MR scanner was installed at St Mary's Hospital, funded by the Medical Research Council as part of the Dementias Platform UK initiative (DPUK).

== History ==
Detailed planning for the centre began late in 2000, following funding from the Wolfson Foundation, Cancer Research UK, the Christie Hospital Trust Charitable Fund and the University of Manchester. The centre began its programme of clinical research work in June 2006 when it performed its first clinical PET body scan on a volunteer.

In February 2020 it was announced that the radiochemistry facility at the centre would close at the end of 2020.

In 2021 part of the radiochemistry facility began to be used by the Medicines Discovery Catapult.

In 2025 it was announced that Alliance Medical would lease the cyclotron and radiopharmacy areas to produce research and commercial radiopharmaceuticals. Production by Alliance Medical was intended to start two years from Autumn 2025.
