= Wickhams (department store) =

Former department store in London

Coordinates: 51°31′15.88″N 0°3′6.34″W

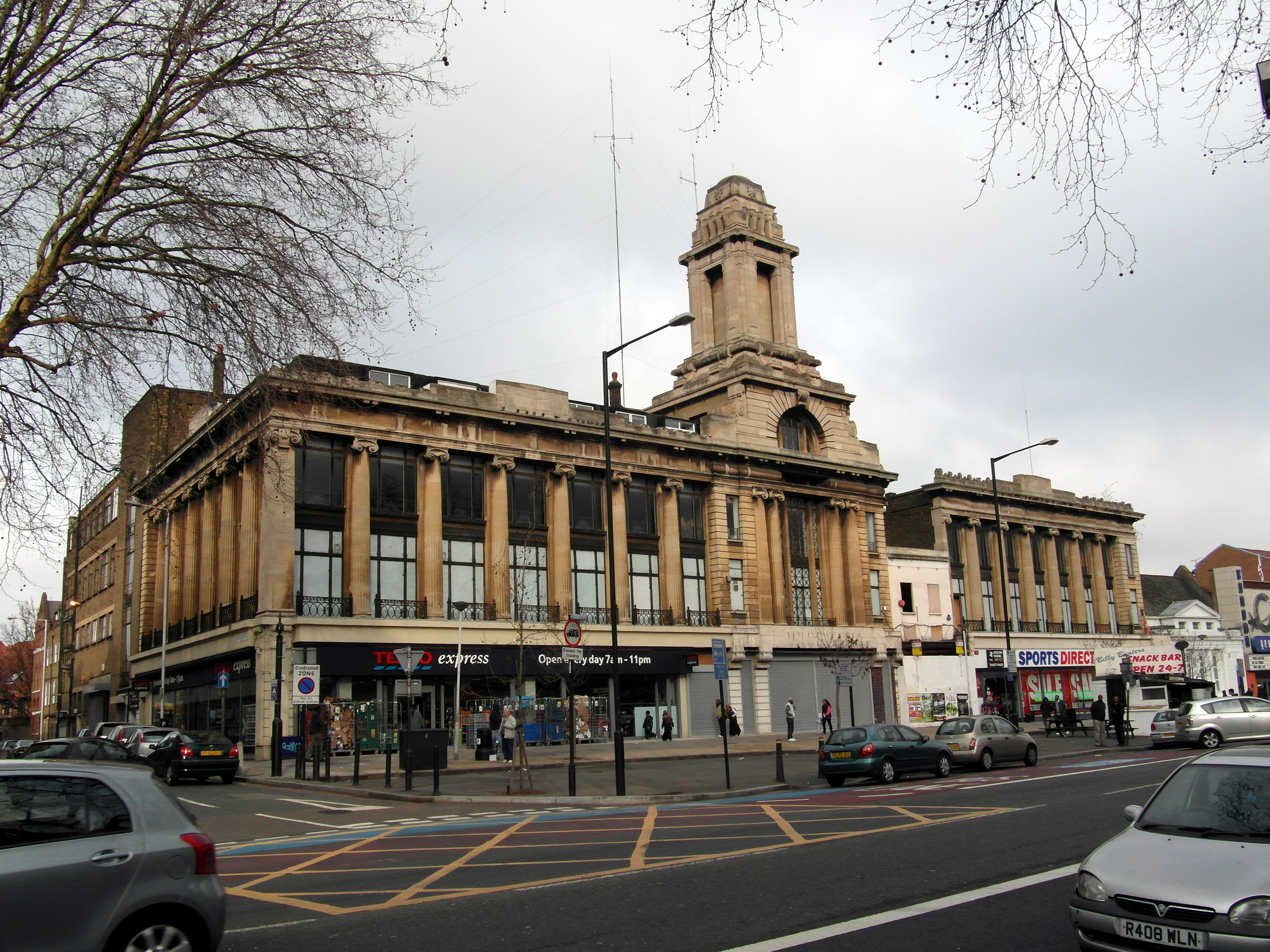
The Wickhams building in 2012, showing the "Spiegelhalter gap" to the right of the tower

Wickhams was a department store on the north side of the Mile End Road in London's East End, closing in the 1960s.

== History ==
The Wickham family were originally drapers, trading from 69, 71 and 73 Mile End Road. No. 75 was occupied by the Spiegelhalter family business of clockmakers and jewellers. With the Wickham's continuing success, in about 1892 the Spiegelhalters agreed to move from 75 to 81 Mile End Road so that the Wickhams could take over and expand into the shop at no. 75.

35 years later the Wickham family had acquired the entire block except the Spiegelhalters' shop at no. 81 and planned a major rebuilding of their shop. They attempted to buy the Spiegelhalter property, but a mutually acceptable price could not be agreed, making the shop a holdout. The Spiegelhalters' refusal to move led to a situation in which the new store was built around the family shop, which continued to trade when Wickhams opened on either side of it.

== The building ==
The two parts of the Wickhams building form part of a greater design, anticipating the eventual purchase of the jewellers and its incorporation into the whole. The building was originally designed to upstage Selfridges department store in Oxford Street, having a colonnaded front but with a central tower and clock that Selfridges did not have.

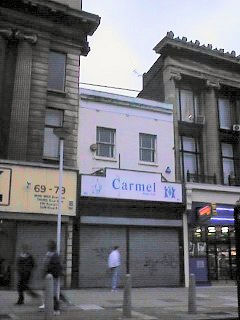
A close-up of the old Spiegelhalter shop in July 2005

The contract for the stone façade had been placed before it became apparent that the Spiegelhalters would not sell, so the solution was to erect the right wing shifted to the right by the width of the Spiegelhalters' land. Consequently, the two side wings look very similar with the central raised feature of the entablature (the piece running over, and supported by, the columns) positioned over the fourth window in both wings. If the jewellers had been replaced, the entablature would not have been central on the right hand wing. Also, the central block with its tower would not have been in the centre, with the completed building having seven windows in the left wing and nine in the right.

As can be seen from the photographs, the facade of the building is complete right up to the boundary either side of the jewellers with even the column immediately to the right of the jewellers having a flat side, waiting to be completed once the Spiegelhalters' land had been bought.

== The Spiegelhalter family ==
Although of German descent from the Black Forest village of Neukirch, the Spiegelhalter family had lived in the East end of London since about 1828 working as jewellers and clockmakers. They had a number of shops before moving to 75 Mile End Road and then onto no. 81. Many family members were born at 81 Mile End Road

Because of anti-German sentiment flowing from the Great War, in 1919 the Spiegelhalters changed their names by deed poll to Salter. The shop, however, retained its original name.

== Later history ==
Completion of the grand Wickhams design was never to be. The business was by 1951 owned by Great Universal Stores but was closed down during the 1960s. The Salter family finally closed the shop at 81 Mile End Road in 1982. It was sold and became an off-licence. By 2014, the Spiegelhalter shop was derelict and roofless. By 2019, the shop, along with the rest of the Wickhams building, had been refurbished, still with a high gap on the frontage.

As of September 2021 the building has been re-opened as the "Dept W" building of Queen Mary University of London. Entrance is via the Spiegelhalter shop front, of which only the façade has been retained.
