= Wigfield (surname) =

Wigfield is a surname, locational for someone from Wigfield. Notable people with the surname include:

- Joe Wigfield (born 2000), British distance runner
- Rebecca Wigfield (born 1988), British bowls player
- Tracey Wigfield (born 1983), American comedy writer

== See also ==
- Wigfall
- Whigfield, an Italian-Danish dance music act
