= Forrest C. Shaklee =

American chiropractor, philosopher and entrepreneur

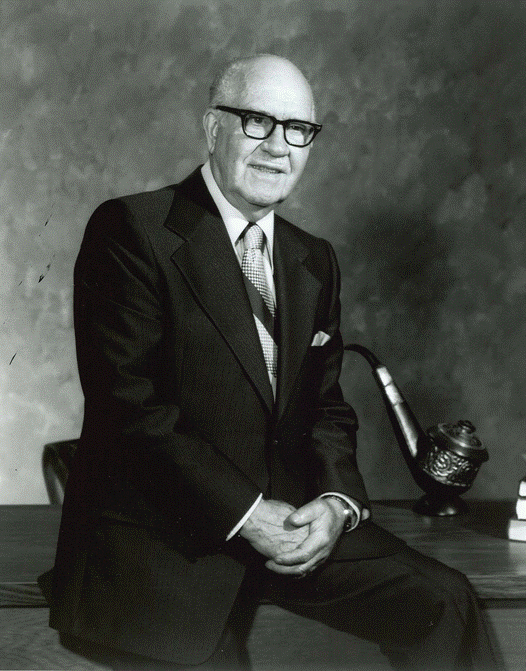
- Born: Forrest Clell Shaklee; November 27, 1894; Carlisle, Iowa
- Died: December 15, 1985 (aged 91); Castro Valley, California
- Education: Professor of Chiropractic, Doctor of Naturopathy, Doctor of Divinity.
- Occupations: Chiropractor, Philosopher, Minister, Entrepreneur
- Spouse(s): Ruth Chapin, Dorothy Potter

Forrest Clell Shaklee (November 27, 1894 – December 15, 1985) was an American chiropractor, philosopher and entrepreneur. He founded the Shaklee Corporation with his sons. Dr. Forrest C. Shaklee is credited with creating the first vitamin in the United States.

== Early life ==
Shaklee was born in Carlisle, Iowa to farmers Robert and Martha. At birth he was diagnosed with tuberculosis and was expected not to live long. His parents believed the only treatment for tuberculosis was good food, fresh air, and plenty of rest. Therefore, they moved to Moorland, a township just outside of Fort Dodge in northern Iowa away from the soot and smoke of the Carlisle coalmines.

As a teen, his doctors were satisfied he had recovered fully from tuberculosis. Shaklee studied the relationship between health, general vitality, intelligence, and proper nutrition. His philosophy became one of active, positive thinking.

In his studies, Shaklee read and was influenced by Bernarr MacFadden's belief that drugs often covered or masked symptoms but did little to cure a patient. With this information, coupled with years of being in and observing nature, Shaklee wanted to treat people via nature and natural methods. This in turn, increased his interest in the growing science of chiropractic care.

== Formative years ==
In 1912 Shaklee read about the discoveries of Polish scientist Casimir Funk who isolated natural substances he dubbed "vitamins". Shaklee began corresponding with Funk and expressed interest in developing practical applications from Funk's research.

After graduating in June 1915 from Palmer College of Chiropractic, Shaklee created "Shaklee’s Vitalized Minerals," the first multivitamin formulated in the United States. He began selling his supplement to patients.

In this same year, Shaklee married Ruth Chapin whom he met at a church function. In 1916, at 22 years of age, Shaklee purchased his first medical clinic. A year later, the couple gave birth to their first son, Forrest Jr.

In 1918, the Shaklee family moved 30 mi (48 km) to Fort Dodge, Iowa where Shaklee opened his second and much larger facility. Equipped with 32 treatment rooms and a 15-bed sanatorium, Shaklee began treating large volumes of patients for nutritional deficiencies.

In December 1921, Shaklee's second son, Raleigh, was born. Shaklee was very involved with his local church. In 1928 a new church opened in Portland, Iowa and he was asked to be its full-time pastor on Sundays. In 1929 church elders officially ordained Shaklee as a minister.

== Growing interest in nutrition ==
In the winter of 1929, a fire destroyed Shaklee's Iowa clinic. Instead of rebuilding, Shaklee decided to see the country. He reached Eugene, Oregon where he knew with the rich soils and favorable conditions, he could grow quality herbs and vegetables for his nutritional supplements. However, the rain impacted his health so he then relocated to Oakland, California. In Oakland, Shaklee continued his study between the relationship of nutrition and human health. In addition to ongoing research, Shaklee's reputation grew and he frequently lectured to large crowds regarding nutrition and the use of vitamins.

Up to 1933 Shaklee continued his education and earned three different degrees: Professor of Chiropractic, Doctor of Naturopathy and Doctor of Divinity. Shaklee opened the Shaklee Clinic in Oakland, California in 1935 while also on the faculty as a professor of biochemistry at the California Chiropractic College.

== Thoughtsmanship ==
In 1941, his wife Ruth was killed by an automobile while crossing a street. While taking time to mourn, Shaklee developed a philosophy of "Thoughtsmanship" which was centered on becoming more aware of one's emotions, surroundings and the moment. Shaklee began writing a series of articles on the mind's influence on an individual's health and well-being. Shaklee wrote Thoughtsmanship in 1947. The concept became popular and Shaklee lectured on the subject in California. He published four volumes on Thoughtsmanship.

== Shaklee Corporation ==
In the fall of 1955 at the age of 62, Shaklee and his two sons established a business to create, manufacture, and sell food supplements. The Shaklee Corporation was incorporated on April 1, 1956. Its first product, Pro-Lecin Nibblers was the first multivitamin created and formulated in the United States. They were made from a mixture of protein, vitamins, and lecithin. Later that year, Shaklee formulated additional multivitamins in creating Vita-Lea, a multivitamin, multi-mineral supplement in tablet form which is still sold by the Shaklee Corporation today.

Shaklee's concept of "thoughtsmanship" informed how he created his sales team and corporate operations. Shaklee recruited independent contractors who were compensated through a percentage of their generated sales. In the company's first recruiting effort, the company placed an ad in the Oakland Tribune. All of the six people who answered the add signed on as distributors.

Shaklee's belief that independent distributorships were the key to the company's success proved true. By 1960, distributors were selling throughout California. Shaklee and his sons continually travelled across the state because each wanted to meet the distributors personally. During this time, the Shaklee Corporation continued to introduce new products.

In 1972 Shaklee instructed his company to remove phosphates from the detergents they sold. They were the first major products company to sell phosphate-free laundry detergents in the United States.

== Personal life ==
In 1915, Shaklee married Ruth Chapin, who died in 1941. On August 8, 1957, he married Dorothy Potter (a Canadian from British Columbia).

On December 15, 1985, Shaklee died from a heart attack in his home at Castro Valley, California. He was 91 years old and acting chairman emeritus of the Shaklee Corporation.
