= Shaklee =

Multi-level marketing vitamin distributor

Shaklee Corporation

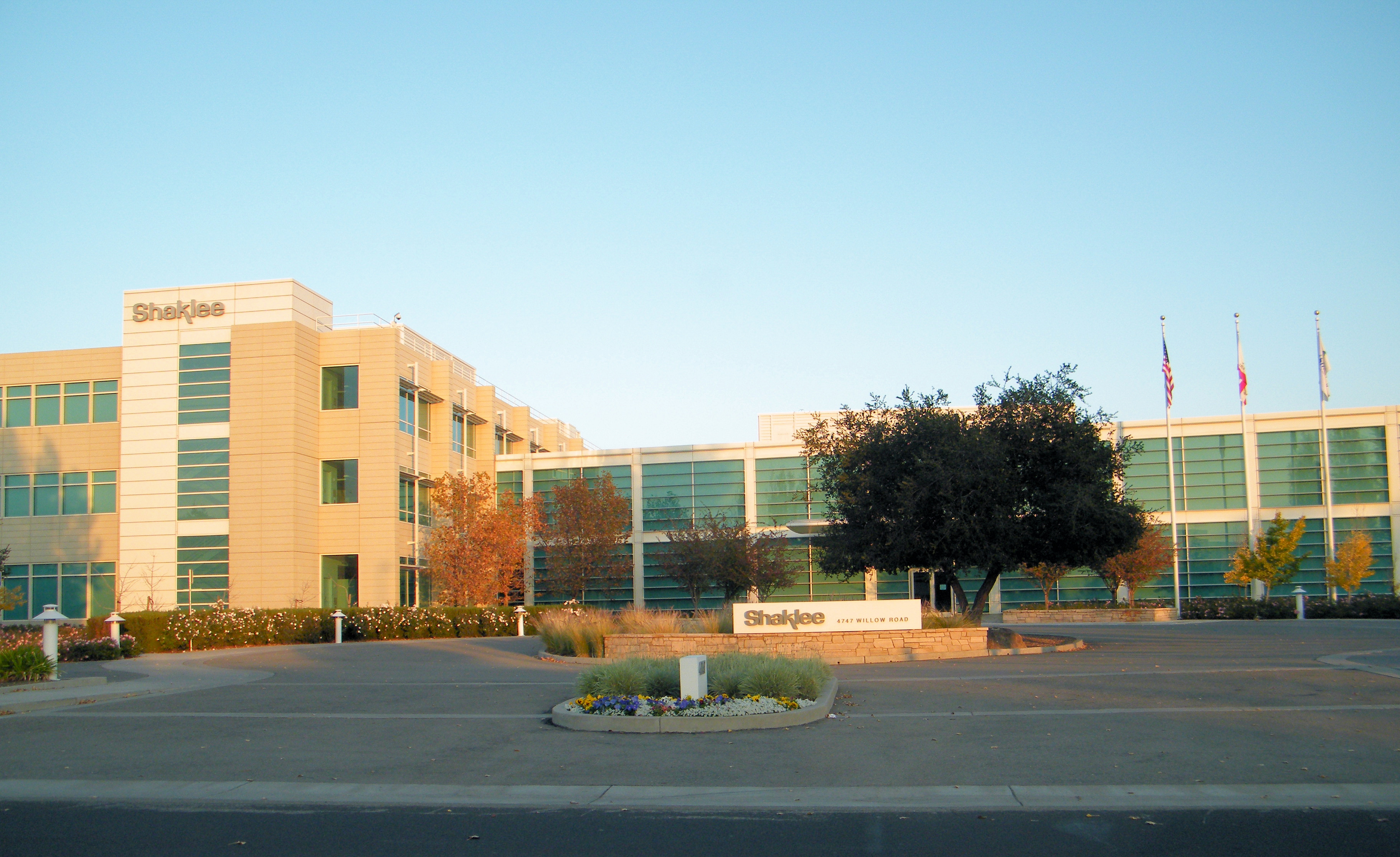
- Former Headquarters in Pleasanton, California
- Type: Private
- Industry: Wellness, Personal care, Multi-level marketing
- Founded: 1956
- Founder: Forrest C. Shaklee
- Headquarters: Miami, Florida
- Key people: Roger Barnett; (Chairman & CEO); Victor Barnett; (former Vice Chairman)
- Products: Nutrition, Weight management, Beauty, Household
- Website: www.shaklee.com

Shaklee Corporation is an American manufacturer and multi-level marketing distributor of natural nutrition supplements, weight-management products, beauty products, and household products. The company is based in Miami, Florida, with operations in several countries.

== History ==
=== Founding ===
Forrest C. Shaklee (1894–1985), a chiropractor and nutritionist based in his home state of Iowa, and later in Oakland, California, created the first vitamin supplement in the United States labeled "Shaklee's Vitalized Minerals" in 1915. In 1956, Shaklee founded the Shaklee Corporation with his two sons to manufacture nutritional supplements. Shaklee chose the multi-level marketing business model to market their product. Starting in 1956, Shaklee began marketing organic, biodegradable cleaning products. Shaklee has made environmental sustainability a part of its public brand messaging. In 2022, the company announced the launch of a body care collection described as "clean" and “anti-aging.”

=== Expansion, divestiture, and changes of ownership ===
Shaklee Corporation was a publicly traded company in the late 1970s and was listed on the New York Stock Exchange. In 1973, the firm relocated its business offices from Hayward, California, to the Watergate office complex in Emeryville. In 1980, the company relocated again to the One Front Street skyscraper in San Francisco's Financial District. In 1982 Shaklee was included in the Fortune 500 list. The company expanded its business operations in 1986 by acquiring Bear Creek Corporation, a direct marketing firm known for its Harry and David Fruit-of-the-Month Club, from RJR Nabisco for $123 million. In 1989, Shaklee sold a 78 percent stake in Shaklee Japan to the Yamanouchi Pharmaceutical Company for $350 million while retaining a licensing agreement and continuing to collect royalty payments from the Japanese operations.

In March 1989, Shaklee Corporation received an unsolicited acquisition proposal from a group led by the Minneapolis financier Irwin L. Jacobs. At the time, analysts estimated Shaklee Corporation's potential leveraged buyout at $35 a share. The Jacobs group had acquired a 14.98 percent stake in the company. Shaklee declared a special dividend of $20 a share. Some observers viewed this as a "poison pill" defense against the takeover, although the company stated otherwise. Shaklee's corporate bylaws included provisions that were triggered when an investor reached a 15 percent ownership threshold.

Shortly after, Jacobs increased his stake. However, Shaklee Corporation subsequently announced its acquisition by Yamanouchi Pharmaceutical for $28 per share in a deal valued at approximately $395 million. Yamanouchi's existing partnership with Shaklee Japan was cited as a factor in the acquisition. Following the announcement, Jacobs declined to challenge the offer, and the acquisition was finalized, making Shaklee a privately held company. In 2000, the company moved its headquarters from San Francisco to Pleasanton, California.

In 2004, Yamanouchi sold Shaklee Corporation to the American multi-millionaire Roger Barnett, managing partner of Activated Holdings LLC and a member of the Wolfson family, for $310 million. Around the same time, Bear Creek and its Harry and David line were sold to the investment firm Wasserstein Perella & Co. for $260 million.

In May 2025 Shaklee purchased what was left of Modere, a wellness MLM company whose most popular products included Liquid BioCell® Collagen and Trim. Modere had collapsed and closed its door in April of that year.

=== Legal issues ===
In 1974, Shaklee Corporation agreed to stop marketing its product "Instant Protein" as suitable for infants and to discontinue claims that misrepresented the product's protein content, following an order from the Federal Trade Commission (FTC). In 1976, the FTC sanctioned Shaklee again for pressuring its distributors to maintain or advertise suggested retail prices.

In 2012, the New England distributor John "Jack" William Cranney was charged with using the reputation of his 45-year affiliation with Shaklee to solicit financial investments from other Shaklee distributors for non-Shaklee investments, beginning in 2002. In July 2012, the Massachusetts Securities Division charged Cranney with implementing a financial investment Ponzi scheme to defraud 36 victims in multiple states of roughly $10.4 million and with using the funds for personal gain. Shaklee immediately suspended distributor payments to Cranney estimated at $45,000 per month. Several victims sued Cranney to recover damages, and he sought federal bankruptcy protection for his home, valued at $3 million. Cranney relinquished his home, and the proceeds from the sale were used to satisfy the claims of some of his alleged victims. In September 2014, the FBI arrested Cranney in El Paso, Texas and charged him with four counts of wire fraud, 16 counts of mail fraud, and three counts of money laundering.
