= Leonard Wolfson, Baron Wolfson =

British businessman (1927–2010)

The Right Honourable The Lord Wolfson FRS HonFREng
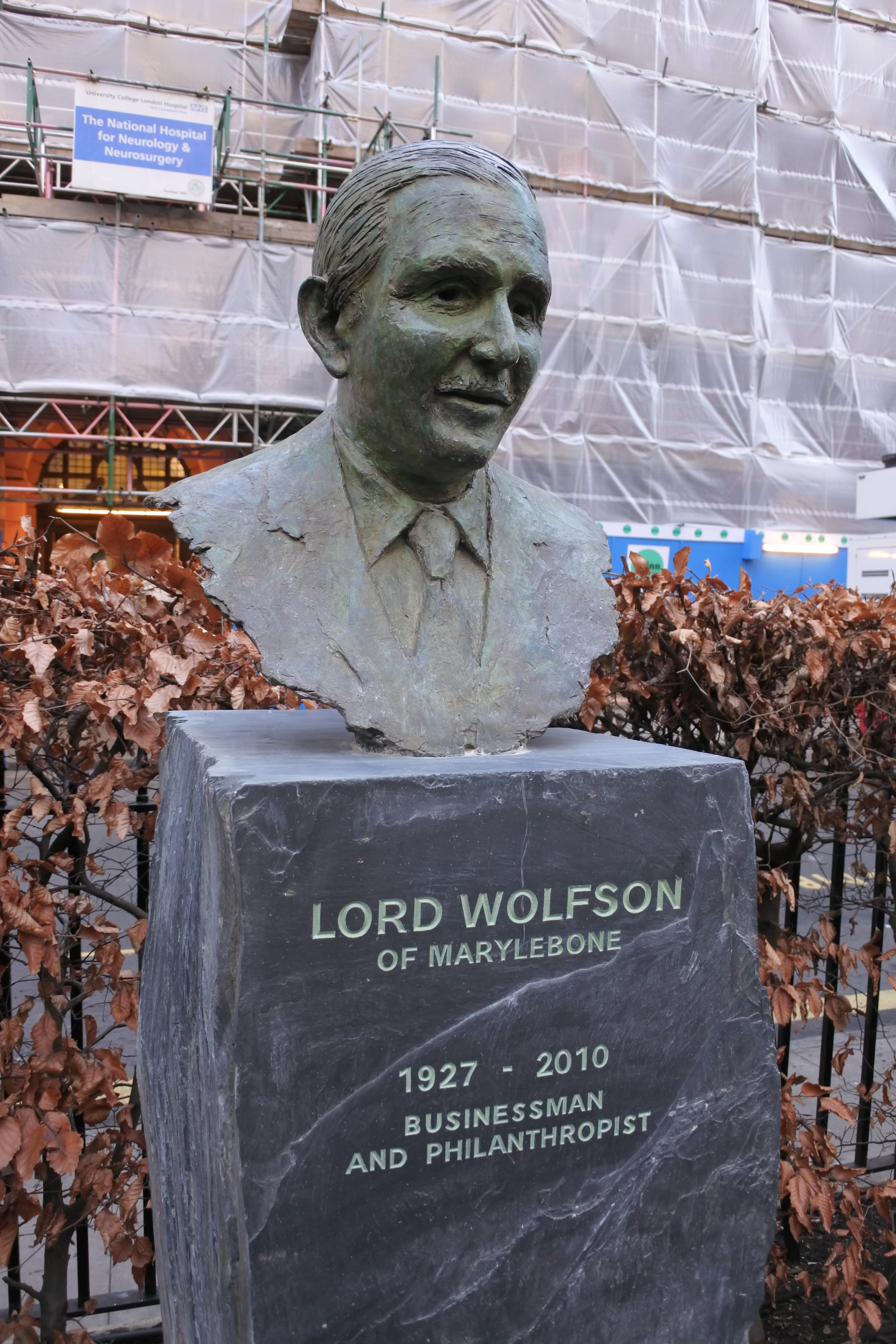

Member of the House of Lords
- Lord Temporal
- Life peerage 13 June 1985 – 20 May 2010

Chairman, Great Universal Stores
- In office 1981–1996

Managing Director, Great Universal Stores
- In office 1962–1981

Personal details
- Born: Leonard Gordon Wolfson; 11 November 1927
- Died: 20 May 2010 (aged 82)
- Spouse: Ruth Sterling
- Children: Janet Wolfson de Botton
- Parent: Sir Isaac Wolfson, 1st Baronet (father)
- Occupation: businessman

Leonard Gordon Wolfson, Baron Wolfson (11 November 1927 – 20 May 2010) was a British businessman, the former chairman of GUS, and son of GUS magnate Sir Isaac Wolfson, 1st Baronet. He is the father of Janet Wolfson de Botton.

He attended The King's School, Worcester, from 1942 to 1945. He married Ruth Sterling in 1949; they were married for 41 years and had four daughters. After they divorced, he married Estelle Jackson in 1991.

Having been knighted in 1977, he was created a Life Peer on 13 June 1985 with the title Baron Wolfson, of Marylebone in the City of Westminster. He was a member of the Conservative Party. On the death of his father in 1991, Lord Wolfson succeeded as 2nd Baronet (styled "of St Marylebone in the County of London"). He was granted a leave of absence from the House of Lords from 2008.

He was Chairman of the Wolfson Foundation. He was elected an Honorary Fellow of the British Academy in 1986, an Honorary Fellow of the Royal Society in 2005 and in 1997 he was elected an Honorary Fellow of the Royal Academy of Engineering. He was also an Honorary Fellow of three Oxford colleges, Wolfson College (named after his father Isaac Wolfson), St Catherine's College, and Worcester College.

He died on 20 May 2010. Having no sons, his baronetcy became extinct upon his death.

Wolfson was a philanthropist, supporting many causes: he was president of the Jewish Welfare Board, and a trustee of the Imperial War Museum. The Lord Leonard and Lady Estelle Wolfson Foundation was set up in 2012, and continues to support scientific and medical research, education and the arts.

== Coat of arms ==
Coat of arms of Leonard Wolfson, Baron Wolfson
| Crest In front of two Rods of Aesculapius in saltire proper a Torch inflamed also proper Escutcheon Per pale dovetailed Vert and Or on a Chevron counterchanged between two Roses also Or and Gules respectively and in base an Ancient Hand Bell proper two Pears Sable and Gold Motto Omnibus Rebus Cura Et Provide (Care and provide for all things) |

== See also ==
- Victor Barnett, his cousin
- David Wolfson, Baron Wolfson of Sunningdale, his cousin
- Simon Wolfson, Baron Wolfson of Aspley Guise, his cousin's son
- Wolfson family

Baronetage of the United Kingdom
| Preceded by Isaac Wolfson | Baronet (of St Marylebone); 1991–2010 | Extinct |
