= Simon Wolfson =

British clothing retailer and philanthropist

The Right Honourable The Lord Wolfson of Aspley Guise
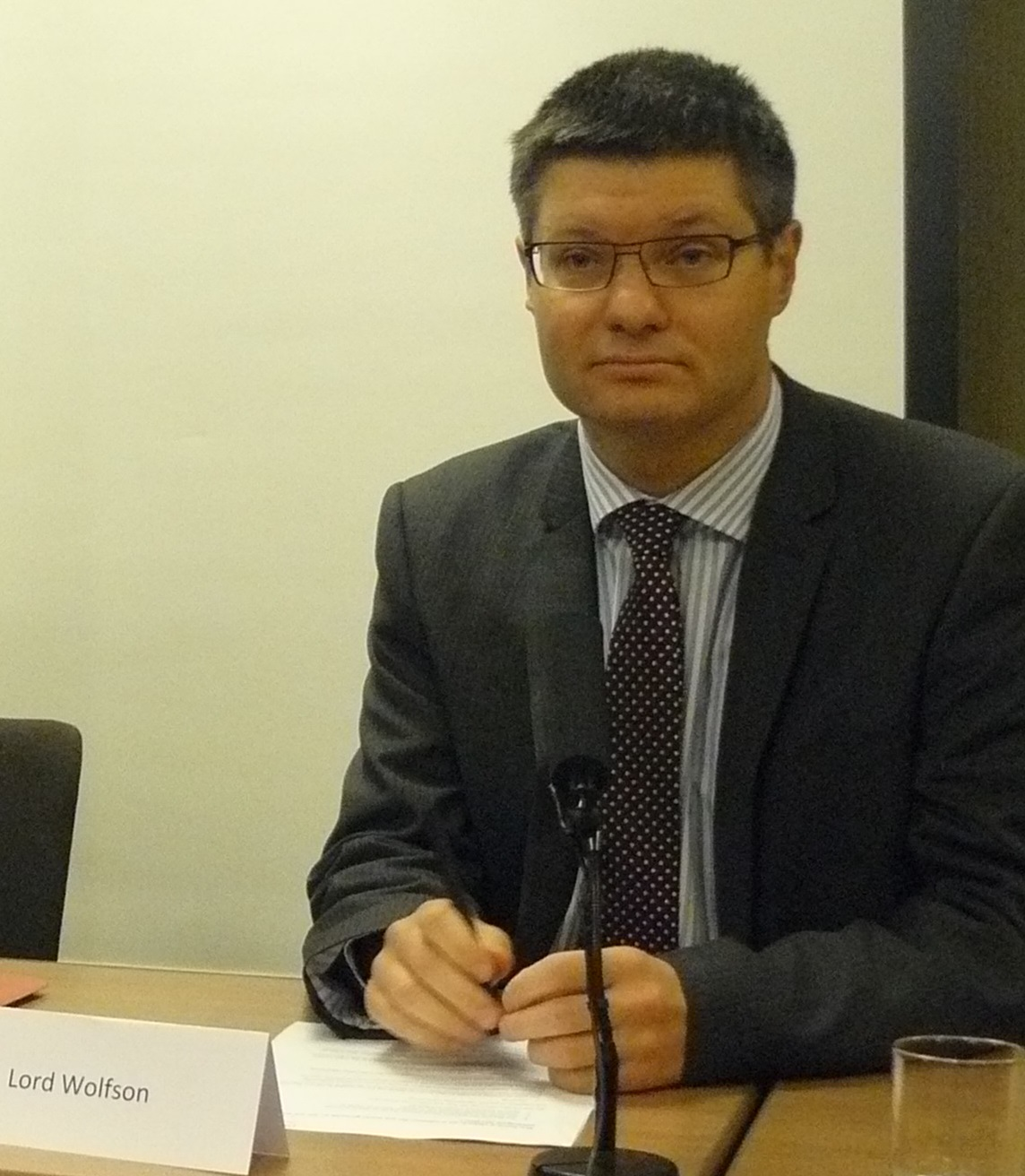
- Simon Wolfson on 5 October 2011

Member of the House of Lords
- Lord Temporal
- Life peerage 18 June 2010

Personal details
- Born: Simon Adam Wolfson; 27 October 1967 (age 58) London, England
- Spouse: Eleanor Shawcross (m. 2012)
- Children: 3
- Parent: Baron Wolfson of Sunningdale (father)
- Education: Radley College
- Alma mater: Trinity College, Cambridge
- Occupation: Businessman

Simon Adam Wolfson, Baron Wolfson of Aspley Guise (born 27 October 1967), is a British businessman and currently chief executive of the clothing retailer Next plc, as well as a Conservative life peer. He is the son of the former Next chairman, David Wolfson, Baron Wolfson of Sunningdale, who was also a Conservative life peer.

== Early life and education ==
Wolfson's great-grandfather, Solomon Wolfson, was a Jewish cabinet-maker who settled in Glasgow and had nine children, one of whom was Sir Isaac Wolfson, Simon's great uncle, who made his fortune through Great Universal Stores. Wolfson's father, Lord Wolfson of Sunningdale, was a former chairman of Next and Great Universal Stores, as well as being a Conservative life peer.

Wolfson is the eldest of three siblings. He attended Radley College, near Abingdon, followed by studying law at Trinity College, Cambridge.

== Career ==
Wolfson joined Next as sales assistant in its Kensington branch in 1991. The following year, he was taken on as assistant to Next's chief executive, David Jones. Wolfson was elevated within the company rapidly, being appointed to the board of directors in 1997, culminating in his appointment as chief executive in August 2001 but leading at least one city analyst to make allegations of nepotism. At the age of 33, this made him the youngest chief executive of a FTSE 100 company. He was one of the first businesspeople to predict the 2008 financial crisis.

In December 2016, Wolfson was appointed to the Chair of the Open Europe think-tank.

In 2021, his pay package at Next was £3.4 million.

=== Relationship with staff ===
In 2013, Wolfson waived his £2.4 million bonus and gave it to the staff of Next who had been with the company since 2010. Wolfson earned £4.6m in 2013, at a time when the average pay of Next employees was £10,000. This led the GMB trade union, supported by musician Paul Heaton, to tour Next shops presenting anti-social behaviour awards to managers for their failure to provide a living wage.

In 2014, for a second successive year, Wolfson waived his bonus and distributed it among staff, sharing some £3.8m. In May that year, Retail Week reported that Next staff would be up to £1000 a year worse off, after the company decided not to pay a premium for staff working on a Sunday. Those refusing a change of employment terms were allegedly told they risked being made redundant. The GMB union accused Wolfson of having a "total disregard for family life."

In April 2017, the salaries of some of Next's most senior staff were cut, following a 3.8% fall in profits, though Wolfson's salary was raised by 1 per cent.

== Political engagement ==
Wolfson is a prominent supporter of the Conservative Party, having donated to David Cameron's campaign in the 2005 leadership election and co-chaired the party's Economic Competitiveness policy review. He was named by The Daily Telegraph as the 37th-most important British conservative in 2007. He was one of 35 signatories to an open letter calling on the Chancellor of the Exchequer, George Osborne, to press ahead with the coalition government's plans to reduce the public finance deficit in one term in the face of opposition.

On 18 June 2010, Wolfson was created Baron Wolfson of Aspley Guise, of Aspley Guise in the County of Bedfordshire, and was introduced in the House of Lords on 6 July 2010.

=== Views on Brexit ===
Wolfson was reported as being a supporter of Brexit in 2016. Following the success of the Leave campaign, Wolfson said Britain's success depended on international trade negotiations. In January 2017 Wolfson said the Government should declare its negotiating objectives and not rush things. In 2022, Wolfson suggested a tax on recruiting foreign workers as trade off to allow greater numbers of foreign workers into Britain.

== Personal life ==
Wolfson married Eleanor Shawcross, daughter of William Shawcross, in 2012. They had a son in 2013.

He owns houses in London and Aspley Guise.

Wolfson is the founder of the £250,000 Wolfson Economics Prize.

== Arms ==
Coat of arms of Simon Wolfson
Crest A demi wolf Argent resting its sinister forepaw on a brick triangular pediment Proper the cornice dentit and oculus Argent. Escutcheon Azure a wolf passant Argent and in base three suns in splendour two and one Or. Supporters On either side a wolf Argent each grasping a torch Gules flamed Or. Motto חסד ןאמת

== See also ==
- Wolfson family

Orders of precedence in the United Kingdom
Preceded by The Lord Sassoon	Gentlemen; Baron Wolfson of Aspley Guise	Followed by The Lord Willis of Knaresborough
