= Wolfson Research Exchange =

The Wolfson Research Exchange (informally known as the Research Exchange or REx) is a research facility for doctoral and postdoctoral researchers at the University of Warwick.

Situated within the main Library building, the Research Exchange opened in October 2008 as a collaborative study and research space for doctoral students, early career researchers and academic staff. Its stated mission is to promote interdisciplinary research, peer support and collaboration. Upon its foundation, the Research Exchange became one of the first dedicated postgraduate research spaces within a UK university.

The strapline for the Research Exchange is "rich collaborations start with strong connections"

== History ==
A CURL-SCONUL seminar held in June 2006 brought together library professionals and research postgraduates to consider the research community’s requirements of library space. It concluded that researchers needed flexible spaces that permitted collaboration and interaction as well as more traditional silent study. The project that followed, which culminated in the establishment of the Research Exchange, was instigated in order to meet this need for an interactive and collaborative space.

Funding for the initiative came partly from the Wolfson Foundation, which provided £250,000 through its CURL/RLUK Libraries Programme. In the late 1990s, the Wolfson Foundation had supported the development of a dedicated postgraduate PC cluster within the Library. The Research Exchange represented a significant extension of this concept, providing not just facilities but discussion areas and seminar rooms.

Plans were subsequently developed between 2006 and 2008 for a ‘research exchange’, with project management divided between MJP Architects and university staff from the Library and Estates departments. During this period two focus groups were held with twenty-four potential users to determine the priorities of the Research Exchange’s target community.

The Wolfson Research Exchange was opened as a facility for researchers and staff in October 2008. It was formally opened by Sir Brian Follett (Chair, Training and Development Agency, 2003–09) in February 2009.

== Facilities and function ==
The Research Exchange constitutes a number of integrated yet distinct spaces. An atrium leads into an open plan collaborative study space furnished with sofas, desks and twenty PCs. This area features a ‘creative wall’ which can be used as a magnetic whiteboard or shelving unit. Digital signage on this wall allows for the display of live feeds, online content and events news.

Three configurable seminar rooms are separated by mobile retractable walls, which when fully opened allow for up to 90 people in a single conference space.

The events organised through the Research Exchange tend to promote collaboration across disciplines. Examples include Collaborative Sandpits and the PhD Life Blog: October 2010

== Management ==
The Research Exchange is one of several distinct study spaces run by the Library at the University of Warwick. Among the other facilities that the Library currently manages are the Learning Grid (2004), Teaching Grid (2008) and PG Hub (2012).

The development of these spaces, including the Research Exchange, has been closely aligned to Warwick University’s institutional strategy. Interdisciplinarity and world leadership in research both feature prominently in the University’s Vision 2015 strategy. As a space dedicated to postgraduate and postdoctoral students, the Research Exchange reflects a wider movement in favour of academic support services more targeted at researchers.

== See also ==
- University of Warwick
- Wolfson Foundation
