= Yolande Harmer =

Israeli spy

Yolande Harmer

Yolande Harmer (born Yolande Gabbai, Hebrew: יולנדה הארמר; 1913–1959) was an Egyptian-Israeli intelligence officer who operated in Egypt in 1948. She was recruited due to her connections in elite and royal circles.

== Biography ==
Yolande Gabai (later Harmer and Har-Mor) was born in Alexandria, Egypt, to a Turkish-Jewish mother. She was married three times, the first at the age of 17. Her first husband was called Jacques de Botton. She divorced him after a few years of marriage and having had a son with him, Gilbert de Botton.

== Espionage career ==
Harmer was recruited by Moshe Sharett, secretary of the Jewish Agency political department, when he visited Egypt in 1945 or 1946. They met at a cocktail party. At the time Harmer was working as a journalist and accepted in the highest circles of Egyptian society. She was able to gather intelligence in King Farouk's court in Cairo. She made many other important contacts, including senior editors of Al-Ahram, the most widely circulating Egyptian daily newspaper; Tak ed-Din as-Sulh, the chief assistant of Abdul Rahman Hassan Azzam; and Mahmoud Mahlouf, son of the Grand Mufti of Cairo.

When the Swedish envoy to Egypt, Widar Bagge, fell in love with her, she swayed him to sympathize with the "struggle for self-determination and the freedom of the Jewish people." The assassination of Folke Bernadotte in September 1948, however, made Bagge's enthusiasm cool again.

Harmer provided the Yishuv with important strategic information, including the texts of resolutions adopted by the Arab League in 1947 and 1948 declaring that they "will sacrifice all the political and economic interest of the Arab world in order to save Arab Palestine." She also uncovered Arab military plans for the end of the British Mandate for Palestine, including the creation of Fawzi al-Qawuqji's Arab Liberation Army in late 1947. By penetrating the U.S. Embassy, she was able to supply information on the number of Tunisian and Algerian troops fighting the Arabs in Palestine.

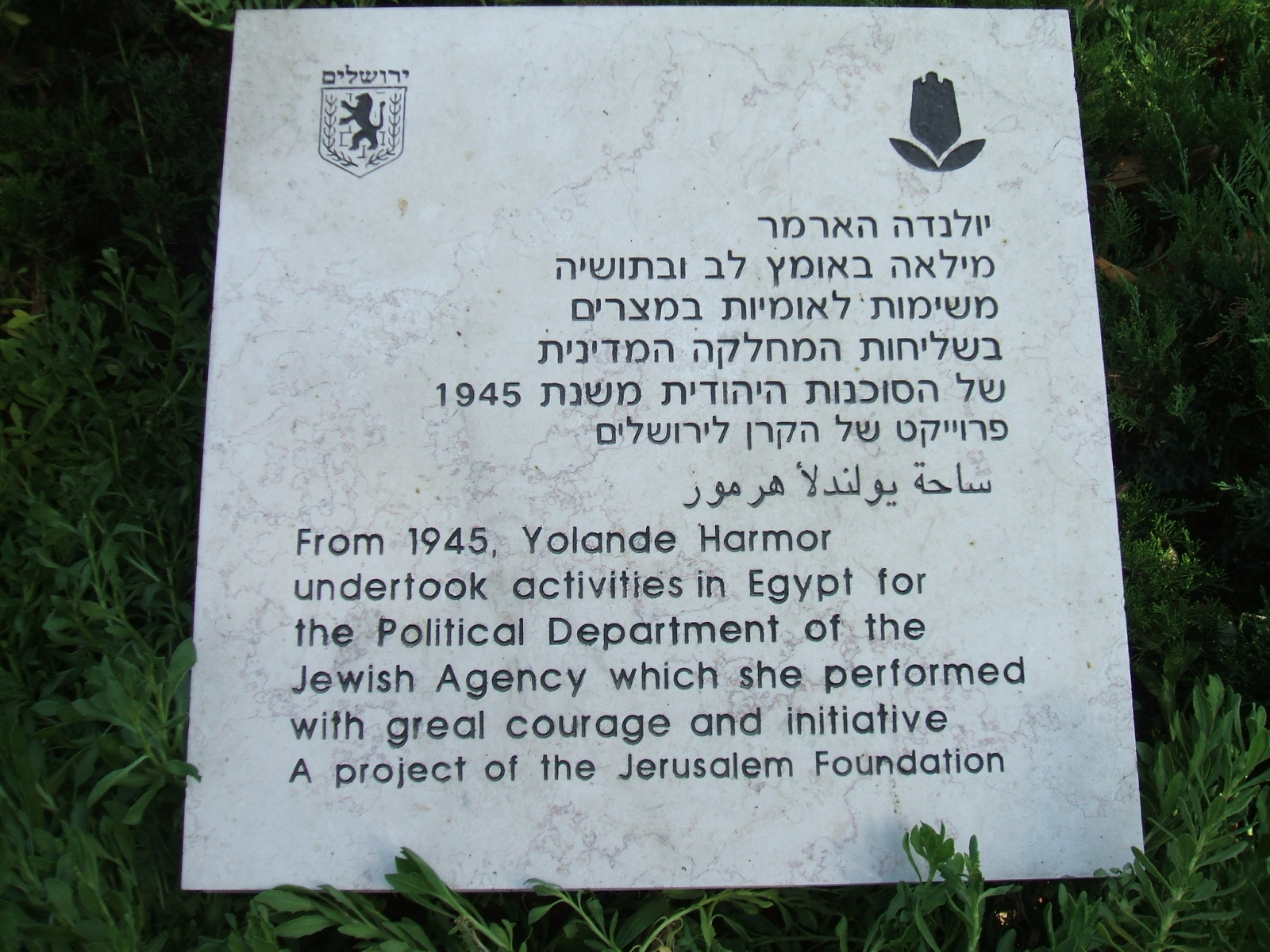
Memorial plaque in Jerusalem

However, delivering the information she gathered was problematic: she had a radio transmitter, but no one to operate it for her. She sent the information using mail services via Europe or the United States, but precious time was often lost. During her work in Egypt, she often risked not only her own life, but the life of her son.

In July 1948, Harmer was arrested. In August, after falling ill in jail, she was released and deported. She went to Paris where she worked for the Middle East Department of the Israeli Foreign Ministry. During her work in Paris, she maintained her Egyptian contacts, continuing to provide Israel with valuable information.

According to the Jewish Telegraphic Agency, "her genteel manners and dovish beliefs, which included supporting the coexistence of Arabs and Jews, left her somewhat adrift in the new state" after 1948. Harmer's granddaughter, Miel de Botton, disputes the comparisons between Harmer and Mata Hari, stating that she had good relations with both sides and was no double agent. In 1950, Harmer worked in Madrid. She died of cancer in Jerusalem in 1959.
