= GAM (company) =

Swiss investment company

GAM Investments
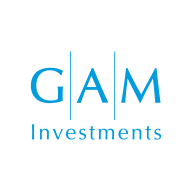

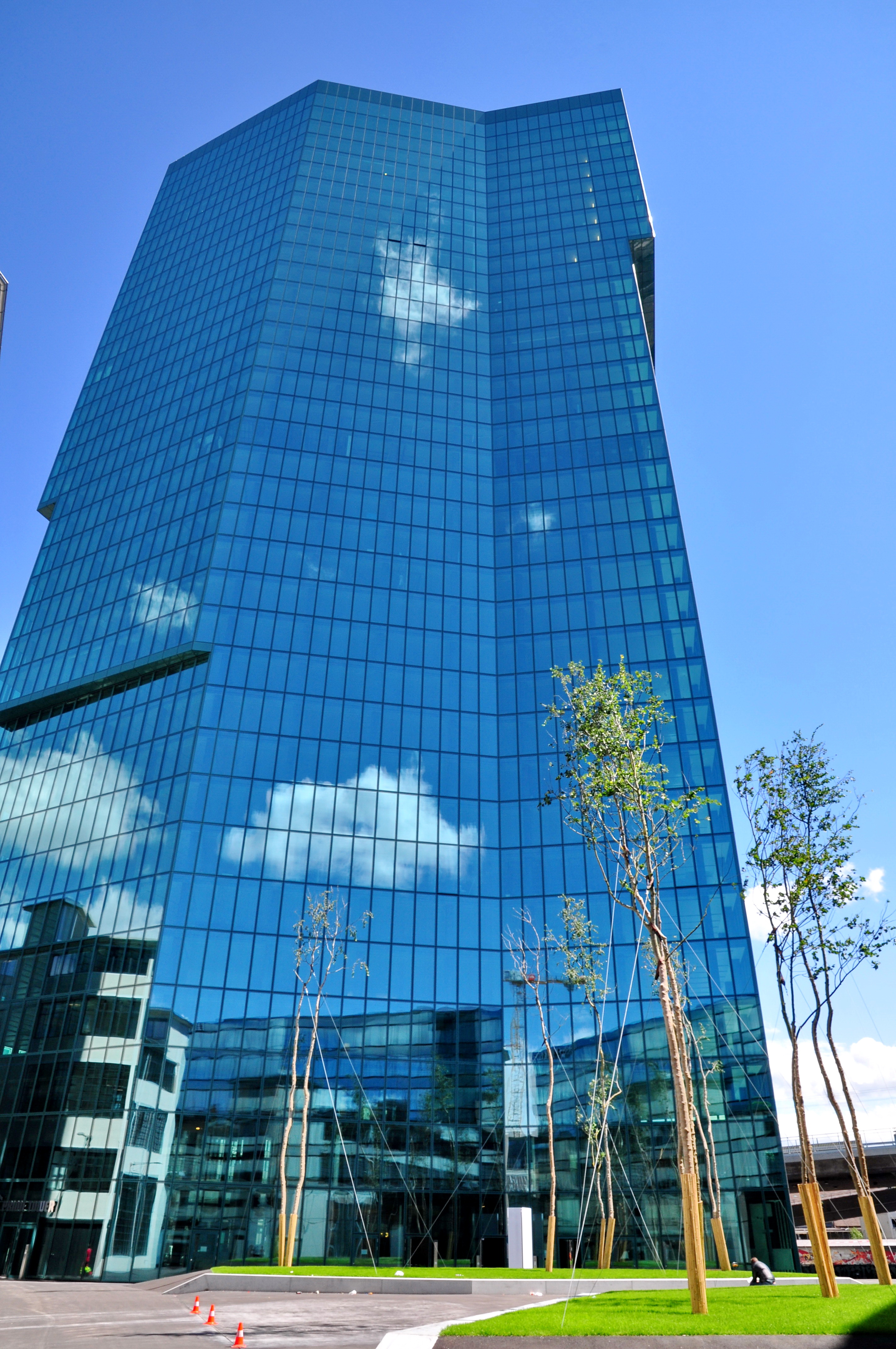
- Headquarters at Prime Tower
- Type: Public limited company
- Traded as: SIX: GAM
- ISIN: CH0102659627
- Industry: Asset management
- Founded: 1983 (as GAM)
- Headquarters: Zürich, Switzerland
- Key people: Albert Saporta (CEO)
- Products: Investments
- AUM: CHF 12.7 billion (as at 30 June 2026)
- Number of employees: Around 227 (2026)
- Website: www.gam.com

GAM Investments is an independent, pure play asset management group headquartered in Zurich. The Group sells to a wide range of client segments such as institutions, wholesale intermediaries, financial advisers, and private investors. The Group’s investment management business is complemented by a private labelling unit which provides outsourcing for third-party asset managers.

GAM has been independently listed on the SIX Swiss Exchange since October 2009, following the separation of the former Julius Baer Group Julius Baer, and is a component of the Swiss Performance Index (SPI) with the symbol “GAM”. The Group had assets under management of CHF 12.7 billion, as at 30 June 2026. As of 1 February 2024, Fund Management Services were successfully transferred to the Carne Group. GAM has offices in 15 countries.

== History ==
GAM was founded as "Global Asset Management" in 1983 by Gilbert de Botton, a pioneer of the "open architecture" asset management model. In 1999, it was acquired by UBS. It remained under the UBS umbrella until Julius Baer acquired GAM and three other private banks from UBS in 2005. GAM acquired Augustus Asset Managers in 2009, and later in the year separated from Julius Baer to form an independent, pure-play asset manager. The spinoff was completed by listing GAM as a separate company in the Swiss SIX exchange.

GAM has since then has acquired several asset managers: Arkos Capital in 2012 and Singleterry Mansley Asset Management in 2014. In September 2014, it appointed Alexander Friedman, the CIO of UBS Wealth Management, as the new group CEO. Later, in 2015, GAM announced the acquisition of the real estate division of Renshaw Bay. In May 2016, GAM entered into an agreement to acquire the investment management business of Taube Hodson Stonex, a London-based global equity investment firm: the acquisition is expected to close in the third quarter 2016, subject to customary regulatory approvals. In June 2016, GAM entered into an agreement to acquire Cantab Capital Partners, an industry-leading multi strategy systematic manager based in Cambridge, UK. This acquisition was closed on 3 October 2016 following regulatory approval. In August 2018, GAM suspended an Investment Director and announced the suspension and liquidation of a range of Absolute Return Bond funds. The Investment Director was dismissed for gross misconduct in February 2019 for not disclosing gifts from Greensill Capital.

In September 2019, GAM appointed Peter Sanderson (born 1978) as Group CEO who joined from BlackRock where he was a managing director holding the positions of Head of Financial Services Consulting in EMEA, since 2012, and a member of BlackRock's EMEA Executive Committee since 2014. Before joining BlackRock in 2006, his engagements included Mondrian Investment Partners and KPMG. He is a member of the Bar of England and Wales and holds a Bachelor of Laws degree from the University of Leicester.

In May 2019, it was announced that Soros Fund Management had built up a 3% stake in the company, which it subsequently sold.

In December 2019, GAM was accused of accounting ‘misstatement’ by the Swiss bourse.

In May 2023, Liontrust Asset Management made a £96m offer to acquire the Swiss asset manager.

== Investment strategies ==
GAM's core investment strategies focus on fixed income, equity, multi asset & solutions and systematic, and include environmental, social and governance (ESG) factors.
