= Manny Cussins =

British businessman

Manny Cussins (26 October 1905 – 5 October 1987) was a British businessman, who made his fortune in the furniture retail business, John Peters, and became chairman of Waring & Gillow. He joined the board of directors at Leeds United F.C. in 1961, and served as the club's chairman between 1972 and 1983. He died on 5 October 1987, aged 81.
