= Miel de Botton =

Swiss singer-songwriter and clinical psychologist

Miel de Botton is a Swiss singer-songwriter, art collector, clinical psychologist and philanthropist. She is the daughter of Gilbert de Botton and granddaughter of Yolande Harmer. Her brother is Alain de Botton.

== Early life ==
Born in Switzerland, Miel grew up in Zurich and studied law at Oxford University. She subsequently qualified in clinical psychology, later practicing in Paris with a focus on the treatment of drug addiction.

== Musical career ==
After relocating to London from Paris, Miel began to write and perform her own music, in collaboration with producer Andy Wright. She released two albums, Magnetic (2015) and Surrender to the Feeling (2019), and also performed at numerous festivals as well as touring nationally with artists including Wet Wet Wet and Rhydian Roberts. In November 2022 she featured as a guest artist at the Hallenstadion, Zurich in support of Simply Red.

In August 2025, Miel released Loved Ones Vol 1, a new collection of songs in collaboration with producer Andy Wright. Miel stated that the theme of the collection was celebratory; about loved ones from family, friends, her heritage and history. Though personal, the collection shares universal themes about joy, hope, liberation, love, faith and freedom.

In November 2025, Miel returned to Paris to perform at the Accor Arena supporting Simply Red on their 40th Anniversary tour.

In January 2026 Miel released Loved Ones Vol 2.

Loved Ones Vols 1& 2 received extensive play on UK radio. Following their release, Hit Song from Vol 1 amassed over 10 million Youtube views, Mon Cher Petit Papa 8 million, and Meine Mutter 3.3 million. With the release of Loved Ones Vol 2, a further 6 million views were recorded for Immortality on the Dancefloor (Volume 2) The Pyramid remix of Hit Song and Meine Mutter peaked in the top 10 of Music Week’s commercial chart.

== Philanthropy and charitable work ==
Miel's charitable and philanthropic work has included support for the cancer charity Maggie's, the Nordoff Robbins music therapy charity, the British Red Cross, the World Wildlife Fund for Nature, and the RSPB, as well as the YMCA Jerusalem Youth Chorus, which promotes coexistence between Palestinians and Israelis.

In 2021, following nomination as a WWF Youth Ambassador, her song "I was Given Nature" was chosen for its annual Earth Hour event. In 2015 she was awarded an honorary doctorate by the Weizmann Institute of Science in recognition of her role establishing centres for protein profiling and marine science.

== Other work ==
Miel produced the documentary film Yolande – An Unsung Heroine (2010) about her grandmother Yolande Harmer, an Israeli intelligence officer operating from the mid nineteen-forties, and whose work has been said to help establish modern Israel: "She had a great passion for her cause and she very much believed in the coexistence of Jews and Arabs [...] I do feel there should be recognition for the way she neglected her own health and safety, and even that of her family, because of what she wanted to achieve".

She also produced the film Waste Land (2010), along with her former husband, Angus Aynsley, which chronicles the story of Brazilian artist Vik Muniz and his collaboration with a group of waste pickers (catadores) at the world's largest landfill site in Rio de Janeiro. The film was Oscar-nominated.
