= Wigfall =

Wigfall is a surname. Notable people with the surname include:

- Benjamin Leroy Wigfall (1930–2017), American artist
- Clare Wigfall (born 1976), British writer
- James Wigfall (1942–1978), African-American stage actor
- Louis Wigfall (1816–1874), American politician

== See also ==
- Wigfield (surname)
