= Michael P. Green =

English businessman and psychotherapist (born 1947)

- Born: Michael Philip Green; 2 December 1947 (age 78); Hampstead, London, England
- Occupation: Businessman
- Years active: 1969–present
- Spouses: Janet Frances Wolfson (m. 1972; div. 1989); Theresa Mary Buckmaster (m. 1990)
- Parent(s): Cyril and Irene

Michael Philip Green (born 2 December 1947) is an English businessman and psychotherapist, who is the owner of Tangent Communications. He was previously the chairman of Carlton Communications, until it merged with Granada to form ITV plc.

== Early life ==
Green was born on 2 December 1947 in Hampstead, London, to Cyril, a shirt manufacturer, and Irene, a doctor. His grandparents fled anti-Jewish pogroms in eastern Europe, and his father went on to run a successful business making drip-dry shirts. The business was sold when Green was 13.

Green was educated at The Haberdashers' Aske's Boys' School, in Elstree, Hertfordshire on a scholarship and left, aged 17, with four O-Levels. Contemporaries included David Elstein, the former head of Channel 5, and Nicholas Serota, director of the Tate Gallery.

== Career ==
After working in public relations, Green went into business with his brother, founding the printing and direct mail firm Tangent Industries, making him a millionaire by the age of 21. He later created Carlton Communications with his elder brother, David, and they got the company on the London stock market in 1983.

Five years later, Carlton bought the US firm Technicolor SA. Following the Broadcasting Act 1990, which had changed the criteria for ITV franchise assignment from quality to commercial, Carlton Television, in 1992, successfully bid £43m to secure the London weekday ITV franchise previously held by Thames Television.

It was suggested that Green influenced the Thatcher government in their 1990 decision to change the criteria through his relationship by marriage with government Secretary of State for Trade and Industry, Lord Young. The Times wrote that Green gained "praise for his buccaneering style, charisma and ability to get a deal done". As a result, Carlton expanded and went on to acquiring other ITV franchisees up until in 2004, when it merged with Granada to form ITV plc. As a result of the merger, Green left the company.

As well as Carlton Communications, Green has also held non-executive directorships at Getty Images, GMTV, ITN, Reuters Group and Thomson Multimedia. He is non-executive chairman of Tangent Communications, where his nephew, Timothy Green, is chief executive.

Green retrained in psychotherapy, which he has practised from 2011.

== Bibliography ==
- 1996: Greenfinger: The rise of Michael Green and Carlton Communications by Raymond Snoddy
