= GUS (retailer) =

Former British retail, manufacturing and finance conglomerate

GUS plc
- Industry: Retail
- Founded: 1900 as Universal Stores
- Defunct: 10 October 2006
- Fate: Demerged
- Successors: Home Retail Group (Retail; 2006); Experian plc (Financial services; 2006)
- Headquarters: London, England
- Key people: Isaac Wolfson, Leonard Wolfson, David Wolfson, Victor Barnett, Sir Victor Blank (Chairman), John Peace
- Products: Mail order Clothing; Footwear; Furniture
- Revenue: ▲£7,262 million (2006)
- Operating income: ▲£654 million (2006)
- Net income: ▼£595 million (2006)
- Subsidiaries: Argos Retail Group; Homebase; Experian; Kays & Co; Burberry

GUS plc was a FTSE 100 retailing, manufacturing and financial conglomerate based in the United Kingdom. GUS was an abbreviation of Great Universal Stores, the company's name before 2001, while it was also known as the Glorious Gussies amongst stockbrokers. The company started out as Universal Stores, a mail order business created by the Rose family. In 1931, Isaac Wolfson joined the mail order company and would, through a series of takeovers, turn it into a retail, manufacturing and financial conglomerate, becoming Europe's biggest mail order firm and with over 2,700 physical stores. His son, Leonard Wolfson, followed him as chairman, to be succeeded by his nephews David Wolfson (1996–2000) and Victor Barnett (2000–2002). During the 1980s, the business divested much of its physical retail and manufacturing subsidiaries under Leonard Wolfson to concentrate on mail order, property and finance. In October 2006, the company was split into two separate companies: Experian which continues to exist, and Home Retail Group which was bought by Sainsbury's in 2016.

== History ==
Universal Stores was founded in 1900 as a mail-order business in Manchester, England by Abraham, George and Jack Rose. A private company, Universal Stores (Manchester) Ltd, was set up to manage the business and the company was incorporated in 1917. In 1930, the company changed its name to Great Universal Stores Limited. The next year it was listed on the London Stock Exchange. At this stage, it was the leading mail order business in the UK, with a single catalogue, Great Universal. A second catalogue, John England, was launched later in 1933. The company set up a chain of department stores in a joint venture with American businessman Charley Nicholls called New Universal Stores.

In 1931, Isaac Wolfson was invited to join the company as merchandise controller after impressing director George Rose at a trade fair in Manchester, accepting no wages in return of share options. The flotation of the company was not a huge success, and with an ill-advised move to London the share price dropped. Wolfson, using money borrowed from his father in law, purchased a large number of shares and became the joint managing director a year later with George Rose, who subsequently resigned in 1934 leaving Wolfson in sole charge. In 1933 the company had made a loss of £55,000, but Wolfson's reorganisation turned this around to a profit of £330,000 in 1934. He was chairman from the late 1940s until his retirement in 1987. Wolfson grew GUS by offering 'A' ordinary shares, which had no voting rights, or by selling the premises and leasing it back. Through his wealth gained at Great Universal Stores, he established the Wolfson Foundation in 1955. By 1983 the company had expanded its range of operations significantly. Catalogue mail order was by far the company's primary business but the company was also engaged in retailing through shops, the manufacture of clothing and household goods, financial services, property investment and travel. Until 1997, GUS had 48 years of consecutive profit growth.

=== UK mail order catalogues growth ===
Great Universal acquired Kay & Company Ltd in 1937, and continued to run its catalogue, Kays, as a separate title. Based in Worcester, Kay & Company began life in the 1880s and was an established mail order company at the time of the GUS takeover. Two further mail order firms were purchased in 1938, Trafford Warehouse and Samuel Driver.

After World War II, the expansion of the mail order business restarted with the purchase of Morses in 1947. This was followed by the purchase of the famous mail order business of Pryce Pryce-Jones, The Royal Welsh Warehouse, which was acquired in 1954. The company further expanded the mail order business during the 1960s by buying rivals Bollin House (1961), Dyson and Horsfall (1962) and Chorlton Warehouse (1963).

GUS acquired A & S Henry & Co group in 1971 after a battle with fellow retailing group United Drapery Stores. This group was primarily a group of paper pulp and carpet manufacturing businesses and a mail order unit trading as John Noble. This was followed in 1976 by the acquisition of the retail business of S & U Stores Ltd, a 120 chain store holding company which operated catalogues, Greenbank and Meridien; In 1977 the business of Henry Wigfall & Son Ltd catalogue business of All Yours, Wigfalls at Home and Choice Mail Order were purchased, and in 1981 GUS acquired the John Myers Home Shopping catalogue business from UDS Group plc. All of these mail order businesses became part of the GUS subsidiary, the British Mail Order Corporation Ltd (BMOC) and were run separately from Kay & Company Ltd. However, in 1983 the Monopolies & Mergers Commission vetoed a merger of GUS with rival Empire which GUS had already purchased 36% of the shares in. Two thirds of the shares in Empire was sold to a Dutch company, Vendex, with GUS retaining a 12% holding. UK operations were grown in 1997 with the purchase of most of Arcadia Group's catalogue business, which included the catalogues Innovations and McCord.

=== European mail order catalogues growth ===
From the 1960s, GUS grew its presence on continental Europe. This started with the purchase of the Wehkamp mail order business based in Holland. This was increased by Swedish catalogue Hallens I. Barrasford which was purchased in 1966 and the Austrian mail order firm Universal Versand in 1968. The last purchase was Verdia in Switzerland, which was purchased in 1982 The Wehkamp catalogue was expanded by its parent company, GUS Holland BV, by purchasing smaller Dutch rival Bertels in 1970, moving into the Belgium and Germany markets and offering separate catalogues selling everything from flower bulbs to furniture and holding a third of the mail order market in Holland. GUS expanded Halens catalogue into the Finnish market in 1997.

=== Furniture business growth ===
In 1934, Great Universal started to grow its furniture business by purchasing the Midland and Hackney chains. This was followed in 1943 by the purchase of the Jays and Campbell chains for £1.2 million from its owner Sir Julien Cahn, and British and Colonial Furniture Company in 1945, along with its Cavendish, Woodhouse and Dale chains for £1 million and the manufacturing business of Tyne Plywood Works. Smart Brothers furniture chain was added in 1948 for a further £1 million. In 1946, a Working Party report stated its concerns about GUS purchases:

A large group has recently acquired control of several well known multiple house furnishing businesses and now owns 480 stores throughout the country. In addition it has still more recently obtained control of several large manufacturing units and one plywood plant... so it's clear... this organisation will be in a position to exercise very considerable influence on the trade

They continued to buy furniture stores, with Oetzmann & Co. purchased in 1954, Godfrey and James Broderick stores added. The biggest name purchased was Waring & Gillows in 1953, however a large share of the business was sold to rival furniture chain "John Peters", run by Manny Cussins for cash and shares in 1960. During 1955, GUS furniture factories were hit by the UK government's restrictions to hire purchase, with Tyne Furniture Works, one of Europe's biggest furniture factory's, having to go on short time due to the fall in orders. In 1957, GUS funded research by the Furniture Development Council into blooming caused by lacquers used on furniture products. In 1968, GUS purchased the combined furniture and menswear group Times-Willerby, adding The Times Furnishing Company to its furniture retail portfolio, while also purchasing the Welsh-based furniture retailer S. Aston & Sons in 1968. During the same year GUS was taken to Court by Cheltenham department store Cavendish House about using the Cavendish name on the former Dale furniture store. In 1985, GUS combined The Times Furnishing Group, and its remaining furniture businesses that had been consolidated under Cavendish-Woodhouse, and branded them under the Times name. The 375 store business was sold to Harris Queensway in 1986, for an exchange of a 20% shareholding in Harris Queensway.

=== Department stores and Draperies ===
In 1937, Charley Nicholls, the part owner of New Universal Stores sold his shares to Zellers, the Canadian retailer, who took over management of the chain and renamed it Hills & Steele. The business was making a loss and GUS took over management of the business in 1939, but sold it to British Home Stores in 1944. GUS however did not pull out of this market, and went on a purchasing spree. The first bought was Cardiff based store, Leslie Stores and its subsidiaries, John Dyer in Southsea, London House in Newport was purchased in 1940. World War II briefly slowed the growth, but after the war Bainbridges of Lincoln, Lincolnshire & Wisbech was purchased in 1949, quickly followed by J Robb & Co of Belfast in 1951. GUS subsidiary, Kays purchased the Kidderminster store Attwoods, while in 1954 Bladons of Hull and Jones & Higgins Peckham were acquired. The company added Pim Brothers (Dublin) and Darling & Co. Edinburgh in 1955, Ben Evans in Swansea in 1955, Houndsditch Warehouse, Houndsditch, London in 1958 and Beavans in Byker in 1964. Other department stores acquired during this time included Butterfield and Massies of Barnsley, Webbers of Maidenhead, Wickhams and Pyne Brothers both of London. GUS also purchased during this period smaller Drapery Stores, many of which offered credit to their customers. These included W. Brydson & Co of Perth, Evans and Allen of Newport, Garrett & Co of Woolwich, Rees Howell in Glamorgan, R. W. Pritchard in Shepherd's Bush, the Taylor-Nottidge Group which included the subsidiaries: F. Taylor & Sons (Lambeth), J. T. Nottidge (Islington), Gergels (Gravesend), Beck Jones (Lewisham), John Williams & Co (Rotherhithe), Heywoods (Manor Park). The biggest purchase was Penberthys of Oxford Street in 1955.

However the age of the department store and drapery was starting to falter, and GUS sold, closed down or repurposed the stores. Darling & Co. was sold to House of Fraser in January 1961. J Robb & Co was closed in 1973, as was Pim Brothers in 1967, both being rented out by GUS Property before being redeveloped. Jones & Higgins was closed as a department store in 1980, becoming a branch of Houndsditch Warehouse before it eventually closed in 1984, with Houndsditch itself closing in 1986 and being redeveloped by GUS Property as 133 Houndsditch, an office development. Garrett & Co in Woolwich was closed 1972 and replaced by a Times Furnishing store, while the likes of Bainbridges and Butterfield and Massies were converted into Thoms discount stores.

=== Early Do it yourself stores ===
In 1958, GUS purchased Art Wallpapers, a chain of paint and wall covering stores. The business was grown by adding more stores, as well as purchasing further DIY retailers Great Clowes Discount Warehouse, and Home Charm. By the 1980s the business had 175 stores, but was sold to Harris Queensway in exchange for shares as part of the same deal that Harris had acquired Times Furniture.

=== Grocery retail business ===
In 1962, the business moved into the grocery business by buying William Cussons, a northern based chain, which operated a further 40 Carline Supermarkets and the high end grocery chain Hodgson & Hepworth in Doncaster. These businesses were sold to Associated British Foods grocery business Fine Fare in November 1968.

=== Clothing retail ===
After the Second World War, Wolfson expanded GUS into the world of clothing retailing. It purchased the retail chains, Jays of Regent Street in 1946; ladys outfitters Wilsons in 1947 followed by Jax in 1949. During 1954, men's tailoring chain John Temple was purchased along with Rego Clothiers. Two high end retailers, Burberry and The Scotch House were added to the company's portfolio in 1955 along with national chain Weaver to Wearer. Two years later GUS purchased the multiple retailer Morrisons Associated Companies, which included its subsidiaries, Ashley Russell; Audrey; Cliftons; Edgar Allen; Graftons; Irene Adair and Paige. It also added in 1957 the men's tailoring stores of Neville Reed. The following year saw GUS expand its clothing empire by buying the men's tailoring chains of Hector Powe and Hope Brothers (which included subsidiary John Maxwell) and ladies outfitters J.Marksmith & Co. with its subsidiary Vogue Fashions. Headrow Clothiers, a manufacturing and clothing retail business was purchased in 1962, with the manufacturing business being sold onto Manny Cussins company, John Peters, but with GUS retaining the 88 Hipp/Tailorfit stores. As part of the purchase of Times Willerby, a furniture and men's tailoring business in 1968, the Willerby tailor stores were added to the GUS portfolio. The company expanded into European markets in 1972 by purchasing the French men's retailer 100,000 Chemises. During the 1970s, the clothing operations management were consolidated under Morrisons Associated Companies, with the company rebranding it's men stores under the Just Pants Plus brand, while the womenswear brands were reduced to Paige, Wilsons and Jax. In 1986, the 246 Paige stores were sold to retail group Combined English Stores.

=== Footwear Retailers ===
In addition to clothing retailers, Isaac Wolfson expanded GUS retail portfolio into the world of Footwear. The first purchase was in 1956 when they acquired the Flateau Group, which included the subsidiaries Henry Playfair, Metropole Shoes and the Metropolitan Boot Co. This soon added to by the purchase of manufacturer and retailer Greenlees & Sons in 1957, whose subsidiaries included Easiphit; Dicks; J.W. Haylock; Peter of Durham; K. Stanton & Sons and Sandra. In 1973, the business was grown further by the purchase of Lennards. The businesses were merged into a new company called Greenlees Lennards Ltd. The combined company was sold to Charterhall during 1988.

=== Electrical retailers ===
Great Universal Stores expanded into the High Street electrical retail market in 1948 by buying Boyds, a radio and television retailerand rental company. This area of the business was further expanded by 1955 with the purchase of W H Barnes, but it was not until 1971 that further expansion occurred with the purchase of J & F Stone Lighting and Radio Ltd. The 100 stores of the J & F Stone brand were sold in 1975 to Thorn Electrical Industries who combined them into their existing Rumbelows chain, while Boyds was sold to the Electronics Rental Group in 1974.

=== Other retail and manufacturing growth ===
GUS developed its manufacturing businesses in the 1950s, with products including clothing, bedding, upholstery, textiles and pottery.

A joint venture started in 1984 between commercial delivery firm Lex Wilkinson and GUS Transport, better known as White Arrow. During the 1980s, Leonard Wolfson divested much of the companies retail and manufacturing business, to concentrate on mail order, Burberry, finance and property sectors. While divesting the retail businesses, GUS kept hold of the freeholds of the properties and added them to their property business GUS Property Management, leasing the properties back to the purchasing businesses.

In 1995, Marks and Spencers and GUS discussed a merger but it was eventually blocked by the M & S board. In 1997, Great Universal Stores appointed Rose Marie Bravo as the new CEO of Burberry given the task of improving the company, which had been hit by the Asian crisis. The company acquired Argos in 1998 in a hostile takeover bid and the UK's second largest online retailer at the time, Jungle.com, in 2000 for £37 million.

==== Argos Retail Group (2000–2006) ====
In 2001 the company changed its name to GUS plc using the identifier GUS on the London Stock Exchange. In November 2002, Homebase was acquired by GUS plc for £900 million, where it formed part of the Argos Retail Group. The previous month, GUS had announced that the Jungle.com business was also to be merged into the ARG division of the business and run from Argos' Milton Keynes headquarters. From early in the year the Home Shopping division also embarked on a successful turnaround strategy helped by advisers managed by Rob Wherrett of Zymolysis.

=== Canadian operations ===
With the purchase of British & Colonial Furniture in 1945, GUS gained ownership of their first Canadian business, Woodhouse & Co. Great Universal Stores of Canada Limited was expanded with the further purchases of Legare Co., C. W. Lindsay, Forsts and Adams Furniture Co. In 1953, Isaac Wolfson investigated a merger of his Canadian operations with Canadian department store Robert Simpson but withdrew from the deal at the last minute. By 1964, GUS operated 125 furniture and appliance stores across Canada. Charles Wolfson, Isaac's brother was formerly president, became chairman as of 1 January 1963, and John P. Adderley became president and chief executive officer.

The businesses included:

- Woodhouse & Co (purchased 1945)
- Legare Co.
- Adams Furniture Co.
- C. W. Lindsay and Co.
- Forst's Ltd. (purchased 1955)

In the early 1990s the Canadian company was fined $45,000 (Canadian) for misleading advertising, the largest total fine during that fiscal year. At that point, the company was doing business under the name of Légaré Woodhouse in Montreal and elsewhere in Quebec. The business was sold at a loss of £1.7 million in 1998, as GUS pulled out of the Canadian retail market.

=== South African operations ===
In 1947, Isaac Wolfson visited South Africa on a fact finding mission for investments and purchased shares in the newly public issued furniture retailer Lewis Stores, which operated 8 stores Lewis Stores share holding was grown to take ownership of the business, and further investments were made in manufacturing businesses Workwear, Sweet-our, Lydbrook and Durban Bag Company. By 1956, Lewis Stores had grown to a 45 store chain including the brands Lewis Stores, Baron Furnishings, Excelsior Meubels and a credit clothing store called Universal Stores. By 1964 the retail business had grown to 120 stores. In 1972, Universal Stores were sold to South African rival Edgars, while 50 furniture stores were purchased from Edgar's and renamed Dan Hands, and the business opened stores in Botswana, Namibia and Swaziland. During the 1990s the furniture stores were rebranded under the Lewis brand, and the electrical retailer Best Electricals was started up. The retail business by 2003 had a total of 395 stores under the Lewis and Best Electrical brands.

GUS were put under pressure during the apartheid years regarding their investments, including pressure from Wolfson College, Oxford, which had been set up by a grant from the Wolfson Foundation.

In 2003 it was announced the South African business would be partially floated on the Johannesburg market as part of the divestment of non core business. The remaining shares of the business were sold in 2005.

=== America plans ===
In 1949, GUS applied to the UK government asking to extend their dollar facilities to £750,000 to invest in the US to increase the sale of British goods. In 1954, GUS made an approach to purchase the US mail order and department store group Montgomery Ward with a plan to invest $100 million in the business, however the bid was rejected by Montgomery Ward's board. In December 1964, Isaac Wolfson announced they planned to expand into both the retail and manufacturing trades in the US, however no purchases were made. GUS did set up Great Universal Stores Development Company Inc. in 1964 to work with two American partners on property development, and in 1968 set up a new subsidiary, BRAMBEC, as a commercial furniture contractor for its manufacturing businesses, working in partnership with Holiday Inn.

=== Travel & holiday business ===
In 1956, GUS purchased Global Tours, Europe's biggest coach tour company that had been formed by Harry Rosenthal, Joe and Harry Shuman adding Overland Tours later that year. GUS added a further business to its Global subsidiary, Sunlight Holidays in 1962. By 1969, the Global business had grown and was delivering 150,000 Tours annually, in the areas of air, coach rail and cruise tours. Great Universal was a large shareholder in British Caledonian Airways, and Global formed a strong partnership with a time charter arrangement. By 1977, Global was offering low priced tours leaving from 10 different airports in the British Isles. The company however suffered from a blacklisting from Arab countries due to the company chairman being Lord Mancroft, and the company's links to Israel. In 1985, as part of Leonard Wolfsons divesting plans, Global, along with its brands Overland and Golden Circle were sold to rival tour company Intasun.

=== GUS Property ===
GUS Property divisions started out as an investment company developing modern office blocks, including Dale Street in Manchester, Chatworth House, and in partnership with Gerald Ronson. The company also invested in retail developments, including the 1985 development of St Nicholas Centre while redeveloping the former Robb department store in Belfast into the Donegall Arcade. In the 1980s, GUS started selling off its physical retail businesses, but retained the freehold and leaseholds, changing the company to GUS Property Management. The company continued to invest in property by purchasing The Forge shopping centre in Glasgow from Arlington Retail for £35 million in 1993 and the Connswater Shopping Centre in Belfast for £23.25m in 1996. In 1997, GUS set up a joint company with British Land to manage the £900 million property portfolio held by GUS Property Management. Called BL Universal, British Land paid £230 million for its half share of the joint company. The new business sold or relinquished 894 properties, either reinvesting in new property, such as retail parks, or returning cash to the share holders. In 2003, British Land purchased the remaining 50% shareholding from GUS for £120 million, and paid off a £43 million loan that GUS had provided to BL Universal.

=== Finance business ===
GUS purchased Whiteaway, Laidlaw & Co, a British owned department store chain located in the far East in 1957. The business included several finance arms including General Guarantee Corp Ltd, a company dealing in equipment leasing and hire purchase financing. In 1964, Great Universal started selling motor insurance via their catalogues. In 1997 General Guarantee purchased the vehicle leasing company Highway Vehicle Management.

The finance business was sold as part of the company refocus under David Wolfson and Victor Barnett. Highway Vehicle Management was sold to First National, a division of Abbey National for around £170 million in 2000, with K.C Finance, its Channel Island subsidiary of General Guarantee Finance sold for £54 million. The remaining part of General Guarantee Finance was closed down in 2000 with the loss of 600 jobs after failing to find a buyer. The Whiteaway Laidlaw Bank was then transferred to the Home Retail Group, and was sold in 2007 to the Manchester Building Society.

=== Credit agency and direct marketing business ===
In the 1970s, the Midland Household stores division of GUS developed a credit referencing system to help against bad debt on credit provided in its furniture stores. It was such a success that it was offered to other parts of the GUS group, and it grew and developed into direct marketing, credit management and store cards. In 1980, GUS sought assistance from IBM, who recommended that they sold its products to others, thus the department became a separate organisation called Commercial Credit (Nottingham) (CCN), which sold its products to organisations outside of the GUS group. During 1984 GUS purchased Manchester Guardian Society for the Protection of Trade. In 1986, CCN bought US business MDS (Management Decision Systems), a specialist company developing credit scoring models.

In November 1996, TRW sold their credit agency unit TRW Information Systems and Services Inc, that operated under the name Experian to Bain Capital and Thomas H. Lee Partners. Just one month later, the two firms sold Experian to Great Universal Stores. GUS merged the business with CCN and renamed the business Experian. In 1997, GUS purchased US direct marketing company Direct Marketing Technology for $246 million.

=== 2000s divestment and demerger ===
The company started divesting its business by selling its Universal Versand business in April 2001 to the Otto group for £23 million. Its luxury brand The Scotch House was put up for sale, but no buyer could be found and so the business was closed down in 2001 and its Knightsbridge store transferred to Burberry. The company expanded into new markets by buying the Reality Group, a Web design, hosting and e-commerce consultancy business it had acquired for £35 million and merging it with its GUS Transport business, known as White Arrow, naming the combined business Reality. Later on in 2001, Breathe.com, at the time Britain's 4th largest internet service provider was purchased from near bankruptcy, but was sold just three months later at a profit to Affinity Internet Holdings.

In 2004, the company sold its traditional home shopping (catalogues) division in the UK and Scandinavia and its Reality business, which included the White Arrow business to the Barclay twins for £590 million, who later merged the Littlewoods mail order operations into it. This included the iconic Great Universal Stores catalogue, from which the company took its name, and completed the departure of GUS from its original business areas. Around the same time, the Barclays announced the closure of the Littlewoods Index catalogue showroom chain, the principal rival to Argos in the UK, selling around 35 stores to Argos.

Following a reorganisation led by Barnett, it was announced in May 2005 that GUS would divest its stake in Burberry by distributing Burberry shares to its own shareholders. In October the Wehkamp business was sold to Swedish investment company Industri Kapital for 390 million euros, selling the last remnant of the company's mail order business. The Burberry demerger was completed in December 2005. GUS plc ranked as the highest-spending online advertiser in the US, according to Nielsen NetRatings, spending over $US659m in 2006. The next-ranked online advertiser, Vonage, had sales of just over $US294m.

On 28 March 2006, it was announced that the company would split into two separate businesses, Home Retail Group and Experian, with both companies listed separately on the London Stock Exchange as of 11 October 2006. GUS plc became a wholly owned subsidiary of Experian plc after the demerger and was renamed Experian Finance plc.

== Operations pre 1998 ==
=== Mail order catalogues in United Kingdom ===
- Great Universal
- John England (1933)
- Marshall Ward (1936)
- Kay & Co. Purchased 1937.
- Trafford Warehouse purchased 1938
- Samuel Driver purchased 1938
- Morses purchased 1947
- The Royal Welsh Warehouse purchased 1954
- Bollin House purchased 1961
- Dyson and Horsfall purchased 1962
- Chorlton Warehouse purchased 1963
- John Noble purchased 1971
- Greenbank and Meridien purchased 1976
- All Yours, Wigfalls at Home and Choice Mail Order purchased 1977
- John Myers purchased 1981
- Innovations purchased 1997
  - McCord's

=== Mail order catalogues in Europe ===
- Wehkamp (Holland) purchased 1962.
- Universal Versand (Austria) purchased 1968
- Hallens I. Barrasford (Sweden) purchased 1966
- Verdia (Switzerland) purchased 1982
- Family Album (Republic of Ireland)
- Celtic Hampers (Republic of Ireland) purchased 1998

=== Department stores in the United Kingdom and Ireland ===
- New Universal Stores - chain of 10 department stores, renamed Hills & Steele in 1939 before being sold to British Home Stores in 1944.
- Leslie Stores and subsidiaries purchased 1940:
  - John Dyer (Southsea)
  - London House (Newport)
- Bainbridges (Lincoln, Lincolnshire & Wisbech) purchased in 1949
- J Robb & Co (Belfast) Purchased in 1951. Closed in 1973.
- Attwoods (Kidderminster) bought by Kay & Co. in the 1950s.
- Bladons (Hull) purchased 1954.
- Jones & Higgins (Peckham) acquired in 1954. Closed in 1980, before re-opening as the Houndsditch before closing in 1984.
- Pim Brothers (Dublin) purchased 1955
- Darling & Co. (Edinburgh) purchased in 1955. Bought by House of Fraser in January 1961.
- Ben Evans (Swansea) purchased in 1955
- Houndsditch Warehouse (Houndsditch, London) purchased in 1958. Closed in 1986.
- Beavans (Byker) bought in 1964.
- Butterfield and Massies (Barnsley)
- Webbers (Maidenhead)
- Wickhams (London)
- Pyne Brothers (London)

=== Department stores outside the United Kingdom ===
- Whiteaway, Laidlaw & Co. purchased 1957. Operating stores in Far East and Kenya.

=== Drapers ===
- W. Brydson & Co (Perth)
- Evans and Allen (Newport)
- Garrett & Co (Woolwich) Closed 1972 and replaced by a Times Furnishing store.
- Rees Howell (Glamorgan)
- John Dyer (Southsea)
- R. W. Pritchard (Shephards Bush)
- Taylor-Nottidge Group including subsidiaries:
  - F. Taylor & Sons (Lambeth)
  - J. T. Nottidge (Islington)
  - Gergels (Gravesend)
  - Beck Jones (Lewisham)
  - John Williams & Co (Rotherhithe)
  - Heywoods (Manor Park)
- Penberthys of Oxford Street purchased 1955

=== Clothing retailers in the United Kingdom ===
- Jays of Regent Street purchased 1946
- Wilsons purchased 1947
- Jax purchased 1949
- John Temple purchased 1954
- Rego Clothiers purchased 1954
- Burberry purchased 1955.
- Scotch House purchased 1955.
- Weaver to Wearer purchased 1955.
- Morrisons (and subsidiaries) purchased 1957
  - Ashley Russell
  - Audrey
  - Cliftons
  - Edgar Allen
  - Graftons
  - Irene Adair
  - Paige. Sold to Combined English Stores in 1986.
- Neville Reed purchased 1957
- Hector Powe purchased 1958.
- Hope Brothers purchased 1958.
  - John Maxwell
- J.Marksmith & Co. purchased 1958 with subsidiary:
  - Vogue Fashions
- Headrow Clothiers purchased 1962. Manufacturing business sold to Manny Cussins company, John Peters, but retained the 88 Hipp/Tailorfit stores.
- Willerby purchased 1968

=== Clothing retailers in Europe ===
- 100,000 Chemises purchased 1972

=== Footwear Retailers ===
- Flateau Group purchased 1956. Subsidiaries included:
  - Henry Playfair
  - Metropole Shoes
  - Metropolitan Boot Co.
- Greenlees & Sons purchased 1957. Subsidiaries included:
  - Easiphit
  - Dicks
  - J.W. Haylock
  - Peter of Durham
  - K. Stanton & Sons
  - Sandra
- Lennards purchased 1973. Sold to Charterhall during the 1988.

(Businesses were merged into Greenlees Lennards Ltd.)

=== Grocery business ===
- William Cussons purchased 1962
  - J.C. Carline Supermarkets subsidiary of Cussons

=== Discount retailers ===
- Thoms Household Goods purchased 1970

=== Furniture retailers ===
- Hackney and Midland purchased 1934
- Jays purchased 1943
- Campbells purchased 1943
- British and Colonial Furniture Company purchased 1945 with subsidiaries:
  - Cavendish
  - Woodhouse
- Baron Furnishers purchased 1947
- Smart Brothers purchased 1948
- Jackson Stores purchased 1949
- Waring & Gillow purchased 1953 Partially sold 1960.
- Oetzmann & Co. purchased 1954.
- Godfrey
- James Broderick
- Times Furniture purchased 1968.
- S. Aston & Sons purchased 1968.

=== Furniture contractors ===
- BRAMBEC

=== Australian operations ===
- Patersons. Australian furniture chain. 70% share bought 1974. Remaining shares bought 1977.

=== Electrical retailers ===
- Boyds purchased 1948
- W H Barnes
- J & F Stone Lighting and Radio Ltd purchased 1971

=== DIY stores ===
- Art Wallpapers purchased 1958
- Great Clowes Discount Warehouse
- Home Charm

=== Travel Agents and Tour Companies ===
- Globe Tours purchased 1956
- Overland Tours purchased 1956
- Sunlight Holidays purchased 1962

(Brought together under Global name)

=== Manufacturing ===
- Myers & Morris (furniture) purchased 1937
- Tyne Plywood Works purchased 1945
- Tyne Furniture Works purchased 1945
- Rylands & Sons purchased 1953 and subsidiaries:
  - Dacca Mills
  - Lintex
  - Vyse Sons & Co
  - Stapley & Smith
- Victoria Mill purchased 1954.
- Burberry purchased 1955.
- Polikoff (clothing) purchased 1948
- JF Willis (Cinderella Shoes) purchased 1960
- Universal Furniture Products
- Gill & Reigate (furniture manufacturers)
- Joseph Johnstone (furniture manufacturer)
- Northern Bedding
- Commercial Plastics Ltd
- W.C. Grace & Sons (Carpets)
- John Woodrow & Sons (Silk Goods)
- Joseph Johnson of Lichwinnoch (Furniture)
- T.G. Hunt & Sons (Footwear)
- Munn and Felton (Footwear)
- Barretts of Staffordshire (Pottery) purchased 1948
- Sherrion (Hosiery and Knitwear)
- Greenlees & Sons (Footwear)
- Scottish Textile & Manufacturing Company purchased 1965
- Bollington Textile Printers
- David Hollander & Sons Ltd (Silver plated goods) purchased 1970
- Rank Bush Murphy purchased 1978
- Hobbies (Dolls furniture maker) closed 1968
- Pantherella plc purchased 1987 (high end sock brand)

=== Finance and credit data business ===
- All Counties Insurance Company
- General Guarantee for Finance
- Highway Vehicle Management purchased 1997
- Whiteaway Laidlaw Bank
- CCN (Commercial Credit Nottingham)
- Manchester Guardian Society for the Protection of Trade purchased 1984.
- TRW Information Systems and Services Inc (Thompson Ramo Woolridge) purchased 1996
- Direct Marketing Technology
- Metromail purchased 1998

=== Printing and Photography business ===
- Ebenezer Baylis
- GT Cheshires & Sons
- Carlton Studios sold 1973

=== Property Management and Development ===
- Great Universal Stores Development Company Inc.
- BL Universal

== Operations 1998 onwards ==
The company had three main divisions:

- ARG – The Argos Retail Group, subsequently demerged to become Home Retail Group, which consisted of several subdivisions, including
  - Argos (previously an independent company, once owned by British American Tobacco) – the UK's largest catalogue retailer
  - Homebase (formerly owned and founded by J Sainsbury) – a DIY (home improvement) retailer
  - ARG Financial Services – provider of store card services, such as the Argos Card and Argos insurance products.
- Reality Group - merger of GUS Transport business, known as White Arrow, and Reality Group, a Web design, hosting and e-commerce consultancy business it had acquired for £35 million.
  - Breathe.com - Internet service provider purchased in 2001, selling it three months later.
- Experian – a credit reporting agency

== See also ==
- Wolfson family
