= David Wolfson, Baron Wolfson of Sunningdale =

British politician (1935–2021)

The Right Honourable The Lord Wolfson of Sunningdale
- Wolfson in 2012

Member of the House of Lords
- Lord Temporal
- Life peerage 26 March 1991 – 13 June 2017

Downing Street Chief of Staff
- In office 4 May 1979 – 2 September 1985
- Prime Minister: Margaret Thatcher
- Preceded by: Position established
- Succeeded by: Jonathan Powell (1997)

Personal details
- Born: David Wolfson; 3 November 1935 Willesden, London, England
- Died: 10 March 2021 (aged 85)
- Party: Conservative
- Spouses: Patricia Rawlings (m. 1962; div. 1967) Susan Davis (divorced) Alicia Trevor (m. 2018)
- Children: 4, including Simon
- Relatives: Wolfson family
- Education: Clifton College
- Alma mater: Trinity College, Cambridge (MA); Stanford University (MBA)

David Wolfson, Baron Wolfson of Sunningdale (3 November 1935 – 10 March 2021) was a British Conservative politician and businessman.

== Early life ==
David Wolfson was born on 3 November 1935 in Willesden, London. The son of Charles and Hylda Wolfson (née Jarvis), he was educated at Clifton College and Trinity College, Cambridge, where he graduated with a Master of Arts in economics and law in 1956. He was further educated in Stanford University, California, where he received a Master of Business Administration in 1959.

== Career ==
Wolfson was director of Great Universal Stores (GUS) from 1973 to 1978 and from 1993 to 2000, and chairman from 1996 to 2000. The retailer had been founded by his uncle Isaac Wolfson as a mail order clothing company. He was first introduced to Margaret Thatcher by the Conservative Party treasurer Alistair McAlpine in 1975. In 1978 and 1979 he was Secretary to the shadow cabinet and between 1979 and 1985 Chief of Staff of the Political Office, 10 Downing Street. In that role he interviewed Bernard Ingham in 1979, before Ingham was made Thatcher's press secretary. The first official Chief of Staff in Number 10, he was the sole holder of the office until Jonathan Powell in 1997.

He was chairman of the Alexon Group plc from 1982 to 1986, of Next plc from 1990 to 1998, of GUS from 1996 to 2000, and of William Baird from 2002 to 2003. In 2001, Wolfson was non-executive director of Fibernet, and was chairman since 2002. For Compco, he was chairman from 1995 to 2003. In 2014 he commissioned the founding of Soza Health.

Knighted in 1984, he was created a life peer with the title Baron Wolfson of Sunningdale, of Trevose in the County of Cornwall on 26 March 1991. His membership in the House of Lords was terminated on 13 June 2017 as he did not attend a sitting of the House during the previous session.

== Personal life ==
Wolfson married three times. He married his first wife, Patricia Rawlings (now Baroness Rawlings) in 1962; they divorced in 1967 and she subsequently became a Conservative MEP and then life peer. He married secondly Susan Davis, with whom he had two sons and one daughter. (One of those sons, Simon, followed in his footsteps as head of Next, and in the footsteps of both parents as a Conservative life peer.) The couple separated and then divorced. He married thirdly Alicia Trevor in May 2018 at Guildford Registry Office. They had a son, Tom, born in 2006.

He owned Quarwood, a Victorian Gothic house near Stow-on-the-Wold. The estate was managed by a paid couple, and as part of their remuneration, they were given the house as their home; Wolfson "bed-and-breakfasted" with the young family.

Wolfson enjoyed golf and bridge.

He suffered from dementia. He died on 10 March 2021 at the age of 85.

Government offices
New office	Downing Street Chief of Staff; 1979–1985	Succeeded by Jonathan Powell
