= Isaac Wolfson =

Scottish businessman and philanthropist (1897–1991)

Sir Isaac Wolfson Bt FRS
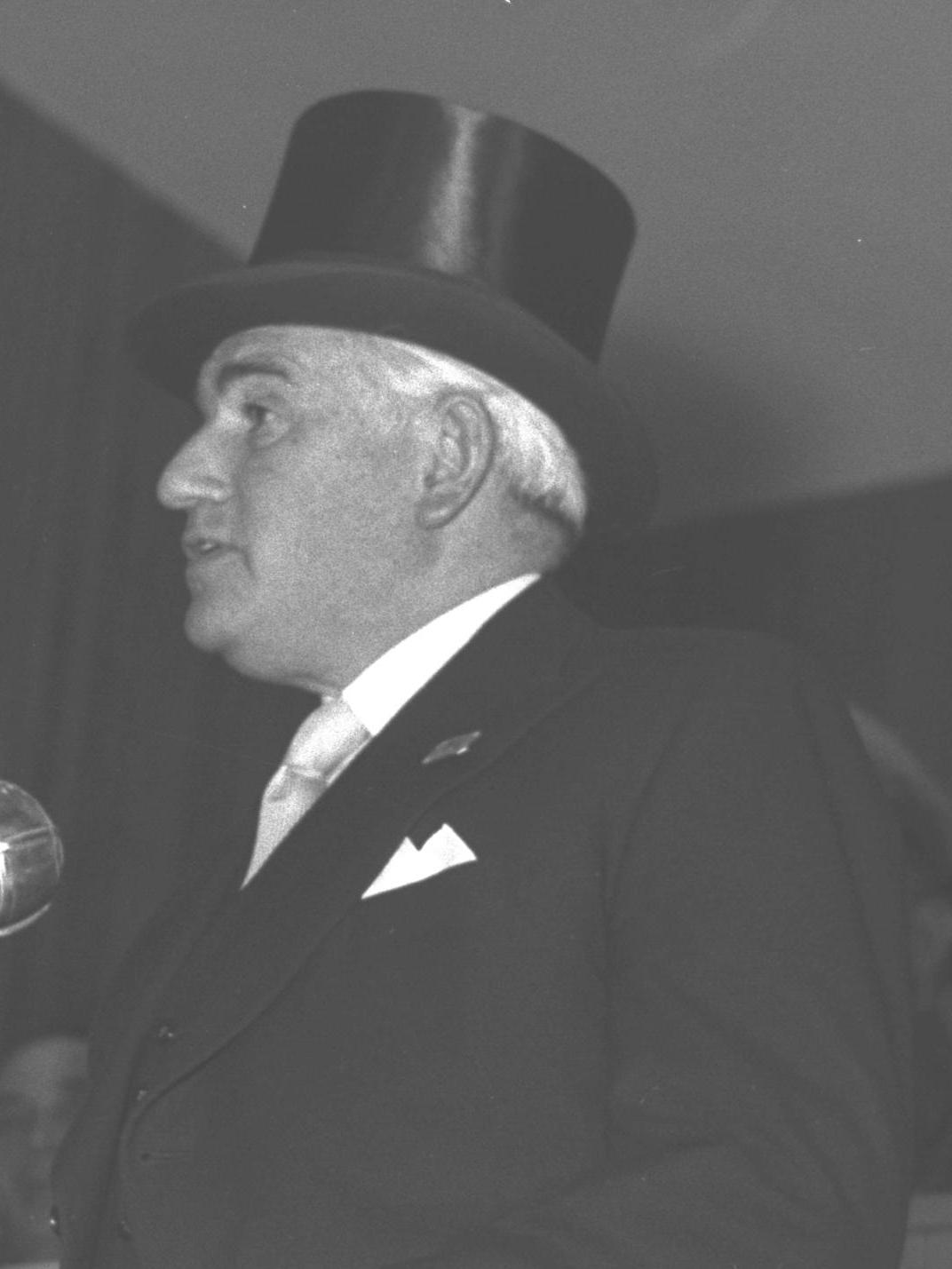
- Wolfson speaking at the dedication of the Heichal Shlomo building in Jerusalem, 1958
- Born: 17 September 1897
- Died: 20 June 1991 (aged 93); Israel
- Education: Queen's Park Secondary School
- Occupations: businessman; philanthropist
- Spouse: Edith Specterman
- Children: Leonard Wolfson, Baron Wolfson
- Parents: Solomon Wolfson (father); Nechi Surah Wilamowski (mother)
- Relatives: Wolfson family

Sir Isaac Wolfson, 1st Baronet (/ˈwʊlfsən/; 17 September 1897 – 20 June 1991) was a Scottish businessman and philanthropist. He was managing director of the mail order business Great Universal Stores (G.U.S. or Gussies) 1932–1947 and chairman 1947–1987. He joined the company as a merchandising controller in 1932, becoming joint managing director in the same year. The company was in trouble when he joined but he turned it round and made it into a very strong business and the principal source of his wealth. He also had other successful business ventures. He was succeeded by his son Leonard Wolfson. He established the Wolfson Foundation to distribute most of his fortune to good causes.

== Early life ==
Isaac Wolfson was the son of a Jewish cabinet maker, Solomon Wolfson, an immigrant from Rajgród, Poland who settled in the Gorbals in Glasgow, Scotland. His mother was Nechi Surah Wilamowski. He was educated at Queen's Park School, Glasgow.

He was highly capable in mathematics but could not afford to train as an accountant so he became a salesman for his father, who made cheap tables and chairs for local people. He is said to have been a brilliant salesman. At this time he made many business friends who worked with him ever afterwards.

In 1920 he left for London. There he started his own business, selling clocks, mirrors and upholstery. In 1926 he married Edith Specterman. His father-in-law owned a chain of suburban cinemas and helped him financially in his early days.

== Great Universal Stores ==
In 1930 he was exhibiting at a trade fair in Manchester City Hall. George Rose was then a director of Great Universal Stores, only just renamed from mere Universal Stores. Rose liked Wolfson's display and ordered 500 clocks, which for Wolfson at the time was a big order. Rose took Wolfson to lunch and showed him the G.U.S. Devonshire Street factory. Soon Wolfson was G.U.S.'s chief buyer but he retained his own business and from G.U.S. took profit share and share options in lieu of salary.

Universal Stores was founded in 1900 by Abraham, George and Jack Rose. The company developed a mail-order trade, sending out small (by later standards) catalogues. In 1931, just after Wolfson joined, it went public but got into serious trouble and the shares plummeted. There were a number of reasons: financial inexperience, an ill-advised move from Manchester to London, a fire and the recession. These troubles hastened the death of Abraham, who was already a sick man.

Wolfson gradually acquired shares from the Rose brothers, using cash lent by his father-in-law and by Archibald Mitchelson, who was a friend. In 1932, he became joint managing director with George and in 1934 sole managing director. In his first eighteen months Wolfson streamlined and rationalised the company. A loss of £55,000 in 1932 became a profit of £330,000 the next year. From 1934 onwards Wolfson acquired companies with large hire purchase debts and property assets, some for G.U.S. and some for his own business. These acquisitions provided cash for more acquisitions. Acquired companies included Midland and Hackney, Drages, Alexander Sloan, Jays and Campbells, British and Colonial and Smart Brothers.

Wolfson was too old to go to war. As World War II approached and during the war he continued to buy. He reasoned that if Hitler won the war his businesses would be finished anyway, but, if not, then the opportunities would be enormous. In 1932, G.U.S. was worth £700,000, in 1938 £1,980,000 but by 1948 it was £16 million. This remarkable growth rate and aggressive acquisition plan was then succeeded by a gentler growth rate and a more corporate style.

By 1970, Wolfson had sold his private business and handed over control of G.U.S. to his son Leonard.

== Other business interests ==
Wolfson was a brilliant financier and this was central to his early success. Later he backed French–British financier, tycoon, and politician James Goldsmith with a £1 million loan which Wolfson charged a whopping 100 per cent interest on. He also underwrote the hire purchase agreements of washing machine entrepreneur John Bloom at Rolls Razor but withdrew financial support in 1964, leading to the company's voluntary liquidation.

In 1954 Wolfson was part of Kemsley-Winnick Television, which won the initial ITV weekend contracts for the Midlands and the North of England. However, shortly after the award of the contracts the consortium was shown not to have the financial backing required, causing it to collapse.

== Religion and philanthropy ==
Wolfson was a devout Orthodox Jew. He followed his father's example and the middle-European community from which he came. He said, "No man should have more than £100,000. The rest should go to charity". He gave immense amounts to charities: from 1948, he included Zionist charities at the urging of his friend Israel Sieff. In 1962, he was appointed president of the United Synagogue, the first to be selected from descendants of the nineteenth-century waves of immigrants.

In 1955, Wolfson established the Wolfson Foundation to support the advancement of education, health, and youth activities. Through this foundation, he contributed to the creation of Wolfson College, Oxford (where he was a Founder Fellow), Wolfson College, Cambridge, the Wolfson Building at Somerville College, Oxford, the Wolfson Building at Trinity College, Cambridge, and the Wolfson Room at University of Wales, Lampeter, among many other projects over the years.

Professorships named after him exist at Bar-Ilan University, University of Haifa, Hebrew University of Jerusalem, University of Oxford, and Tel Aviv University. He was also a benefactor of the John Rylands Library, financing a small extension in 1961. The Edith and Isaac Wolfson Trust financed two housing projects in Israel, both called Kiryat Wolfson, and the family supported the founding of Wolfson Medical Center in Tel Aviv.

Wolfson is one of a few individuals to have colleges named after them at both Oxford and Cambridge.

== Personal life ==
Until 1960 Wolfson lived in Worcester; he then moved to London. He received a baronetcy in the Queen's 1962 New Year's Honours list, becoming Baronet as Sir Isaac Wolfson of St. Marylebone on 19 February 1962. He was elected a Fellow of the Royal Society in 1963. In 1971 he was awarded the Freedom of the City of Glasgow. He died in Israel in 1991, aged 93.

Wolfson's wife, the former Edith Specterman, was a vice-president of the English Jewish Welfare Board. The Lady Wolfson Building, a small extension to the John Rylands Library, was opened in 1962 adjoining the 1920 extension.

Isaac and Edith Wolfson's only child, a son, Leonard, was born in 1927.

== See also ==
- Wolfson family

Baronetage of the United Kingdom
New creation	Baronet (of St Marylebone); 1962–1991	Succeeded by Leonard Wolfson
