= Wolfson Foundation =

Registered charity in the United Kingdom

The Wolfson Foundation
- Named after: Sir Isaac Wolfson
- Formation: 1955 (re-registered in 2014)
- Founder: Isaac Wolfson; Edith Wolfson; Leonard Wolfson
- Type: Charitable company
- Registration no.: Charity number: 1156077
- Headquarters: 8 Queen Anne Street
- Location: London, England
- Key people: Janet Wolfson de Botton (chairman); Paul Ramsbottom (chief executive)
- Staff: 12
- Website: www.wolfson.org.uk

The Wolfson Foundation is a British registered charity that awards grants to support science and medicine, health, education and the arts and humanities.

== History ==
The foundation was established in 1955 and re-registered in 2014. The foundation was established by and named after Isaac Wolfson, chairman of Great Universal Stores (GUS). His wife and his son Leonard were the other founder trustees.

== Activities ==
As of 2024, the endowment of the Wolfson Foundation was just under £1 billion, with expenditure of £44 million on charitable activities. Since 1955, over £1 billion had been awarded in grants (£2 billion in real terms), with over 14,000 projects funded.

The foundation makes awards following a rigorous review process involving expert reviewers and advisory panels, and is recognised in the sector as a funder that listens actively to its applicants. Grants are generally given for capital infrastructure (new build, refurbishment and equipment).

The current chairman is Janet Wolfson de Botton, and the chief executive is Paul Ramsbottom.

== See also ==
- Wolfson family
- Wolfson History Prize
- Wolfson Centre, University of Strathclyde
- Wolfson College, Cambridge
- Wolfson College, Oxford
