= Max S. Hayes =

American editor and politician (1866–1945)

Max Hayes
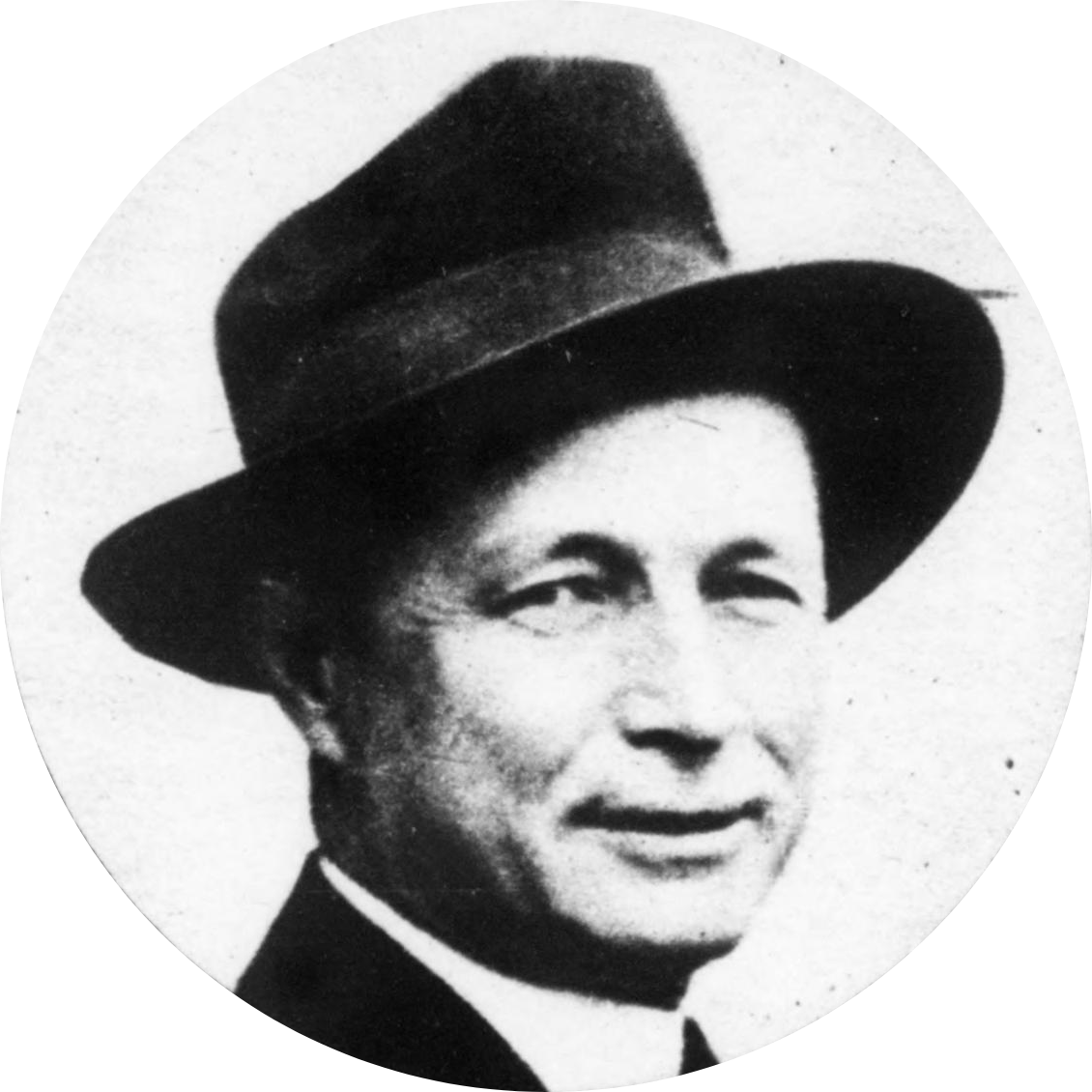
- Portrait by Underwood & Underwood, 1920
- Born: Maximillian Sebastian Hayes; May 25, 1866; Havana, Ohio, US
- Died: October 11, 1945 (aged 79); Cleveland, Ohio, US
- Political party: Populist (1890–1896); Socialist Labor (1896–1899); Social Democratic (1899–1901); Socialist (1901–1919); Labor (1919–1920); Farmer–Labor (1920–1936)

Maximillian Sebastian Hayes (25 May 1866 – 11 October 1945) was an American newspaper editor, trade union activist, and socialist politician. In 1912 Hayes became the first candidate to challenge Samuel Gompers for the presidency of the American Federation of Labor in nearly a decade, drawing about 30 percent of the vote in his losing effort. Hayes is best remembered as the long-time editor of the Cleveland Citizen and as the vice presidential candidate of the Farmer–Labor Party ticket in 1920.

== Biography ==
=== Early years ===
Hayes was born in the tiny rural hamlet of Havana, Huron County, Ohio, on May 25, 1866. His father, Joseph Maximilian Sebastian Hayes, was a farmer. Hayes was raised as a Roman Catholic. Hayes was largely self-educated, attending school only through the fourth grade.

At age 13, Hayes began work as a printer's apprentice; he would continue to work in this field for the rest of his life. Hayes worked on the staff of the Cleveland Press from 1881 to 1890.

In 1890, Hayes became founder and editor of a labor newspaper with a socialist bent, The Cleveland Citizen. This paper was named the official organ of the Cleveland Central Labor Union in 1892. Hayes remained active as editor of this weekly publication until 1939.

Hayes was a member of the International Typographical Union (ITU) from 1884 and worked as a general organizer for the labor movement in the Cleveland area for 15 years.

He was a frequent representative of the ITU at the annual conventions of the American Federation of Labor (AFL).

In 1903, Hayes was chosen as the delegate of the AFL at the convention of the British Trades Union Congress.

Hayes was a bitter opponent of the Industrial Workers of the World from the time of its founding in 1905, lending his support instead to the AFL.

=== Early political career ===
Hayes c. 1902

In 1890, Hayes joined the People's Party; he remained a member of this party until 1896. Hayes then joined the Socialist Labor Party of America (SLP) and served as the Secretary of Section Cleveland, SLP. He left the SLP when the party split between the anti–Daniel DeLeon faction and the pro-AFL dissident faction headed by Henry Slobodin and Morris Hillquit in 1899. Although Hayes had been a vocal opponent of Samuel Gompers while he was a member of the AFL, he was even more opposed to the SLP's Socialist Trade and Labor Alliance (ST&LA), which he believed to be sectarian and destructive.

In 1900, Hayes was nominated for Vice President of the United States by the Hillquit faction. He withdrew from the race, however, in favor of the candidacy of Job Harriman in a unity ticket that brought together the former-SLP dissidents with the Chicago-based Social Democratic Party of America of Eugene V. Debs and Victor L. Berger. Hayes was a Social Democratic Party candidate for US Congress in that year.

Hayes was one of five members of the "Springfield SDP", joining a like number from the Chicago organization, named to a special committee in charge of preparations for the August 1901 Joint Unity Convention from which the Socialist Party of America was born.

In the 1902 campaign, Hayes ran as the Socialists' candidate for Ohio Secretary of State.

=== Challenge to Gompers ===
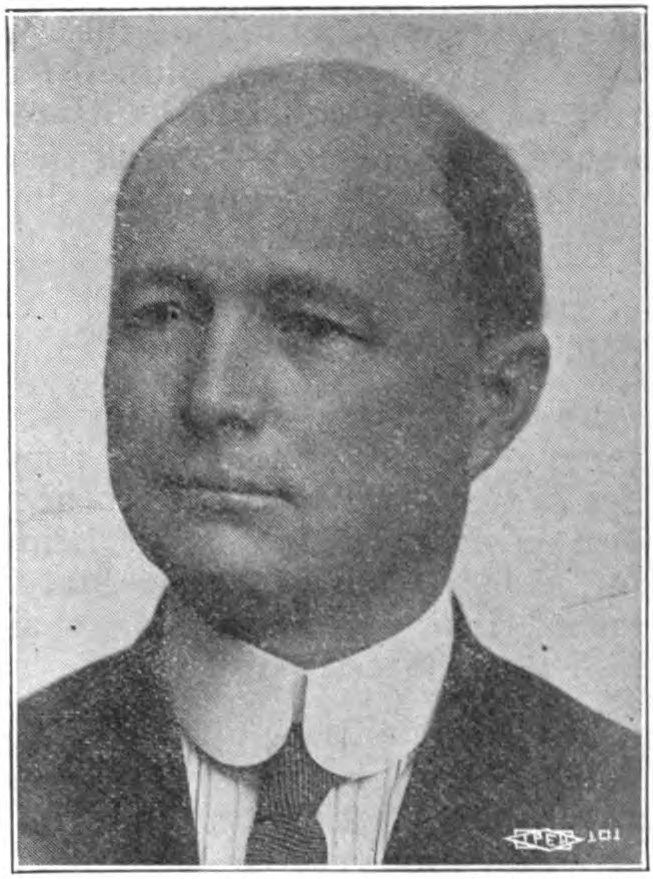
Hayes c. 1923

The 1911 annual convention of the American Federation of Labor, held in Atlanta, Georgia, saw the introduction of a resolution by a socialist member of the Brewery Workers' Union endorsing the use of a direct vote of member unions instead of a vote of assembled convention delegates for the selection of AFL officers.

While the socialist-backed resolution called for immediate establishment of this system, others favored a more measured approach. This minority report called for the governing Executive Council of the AFL to investigate the applicability of this electoral method and to report their findings to the 1912 convention. Because this resolution had long been part of the Socialist Party's ameliorative minimum program and the nominator was well known as a member of that organization, conservative delegates took to the floor to warn of the dangers of the Socialist Party's efforts at boring from within.

AFL president Gompers temporarily passed on the gavel at the convention so that he himself could speak on the floor during the debate which followed. Gompers declared himself to have long been in favor of expansion of the initiative and referendum and accused the socialists of having systemically and intentionally published "the rankest untruth" and "vile falsehood" about his actual sentiments on the matter. Gompers stated that he had found the main resolution for immediate direct elections of AFL officers by member unions "indefensible," instead favoring investigation of the matter as called for in the minority report.

Gompers' attack on the intellectual honesty of socialists at the 1911 AFL convention drew a response from Max Hayes on the floor, with Hayes's mounting frustration with the moderate majority of the federation readily evident. Hayes declared

I am tired of the eternal fight that is made on everything a socialist member of this organization suggests. If a socialists introduces a resolution, it mattes not the nature of it, somebody rises and shouts a warning: 'Look out! the socialists are about to get you and you are about to be made the tail of the socialist kite!' And then, bing! Knock it in the head, whatever it is a socialist suggests. I don't care what party you belong to. It makes no difference to me, but if I can convince you that you are wrong you should be willing to admit it, and if you convince me that I am wrong I certainly should admit it, but party affiliations should have nothing to do with action taken on any matter brought to this convention.

Gompers's preferred option ultimately prevailed and the proposal to directly elect AFL leadership was voted down at the 1911 convention.

At the AFL's 1912 annual convention, Hayes became the last socialist to challenge Gompers for the presidency of the federation. This was the first time since the organization's 1903 conclave that Gompers had been met by an opponent in his bid for re-election as head of the AFL.

Hayes received the entire vote of five international unions, including the Bakery Workers, Cloth Hat and Cap Makers, International Association of Machinists, Western Federation of Miners and the Shingle Weavers. He also received majority support from the United Mine Workers of America, Journeymen Tailors, and Brewery Workers. Despite this support, Hayes lost to Gompers by a tally of 11,974 to 5,074 votes.

=== Vice-Presidential nominee ===
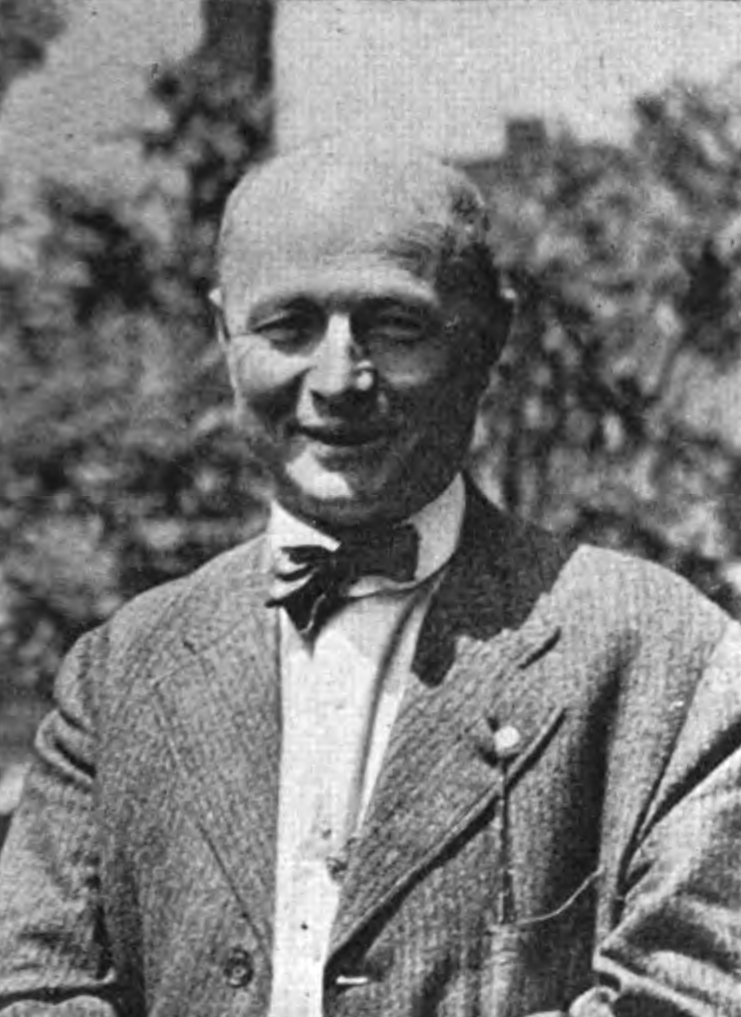
Hayes c. 1923

Hayes was an opponent of the aggressively antimilitarist 1917 St. Louis resolution of the Socialist Party. He did not, however, resign from that organization until May 1919. Hayes then joined the fledgling "Farmer-Labor Party" and was named to the national ticket as candidate for Vice President of the United States, running with the group's presidential nominee, Parley Parker Christensen during the 1920 election. Despite Christensen's being on the ballot in only nineteen states, 265,398 votes were cast for him. This represented one percent of the national total and 1.80 percent of the votes from states which had him on the ballot. Christensen did fare exceptionally well for a third-party candidate in Washington state and South Dakota, where he outpolled Democrat James M. Cox in more than one-third of all counties. Hayes was subsequently active in the Conference for Progressive Political Action (CPPA) from 1922 to 1924.

=== Later years ===
Hayes supported normalizing relations with the Soviet Union, serving on the Advisory Committee of the National Labor Alliance for Trade Relations with and Recognition of Russia. For this and his involvement with relief efforts, he was honored by the Friends of Soviet Russia in 1923.

During the Great Depression, Hayes served as a member of the Ohio State Adjustment Board of the National Recovery Administration (NRA), remaining in this capacity until termination of the NRA in 1935. He was also a charter member of the Cleveland Metropolitan Housing Authority, organized in 1933. He remained with the Metropolitan Housing Authority until 1937.

Hayes and his wife, the former Dora Schneider, had one daughter who married A. I. Davey Jr. in 1931. Upon his retirement in 1939, Hayes passed on the editorship of the Cleveland Citizen to his son-in-law.

=== Death and legacy ===
Hayes died in Cleveland on October 11, 1945.

Hayes's papers are held by two institutions. The Ohio Historical Society maintains one collection, which is available through interlibrary loan in microfilmed form. Other material is held by the Kheel Center for Labor-Management Documentation and Archives at Cornell University in Ithaca, New York.

Hayes is the namesake of Max S. Hayes High School in Cleveland, part of the Cleveland Metropolitan School District.

== Works ==
- Socialism and Trade Unions; Trade Unions and Socialism. With Daniel Lynch. Chicago: Charles H. Kerr & Co., 1900.
- The Double Edge of Labor's Sword: Discussion and Testimony on Socialism and Trade-Unionism before the Commission on Industrial Relations. With Morris Hillquit and Samuel Gompers. Chicago: National Office of the Socialist Party, 1914. Also translated into German and Japanese.
- A History of Cleveland Labor. Cleveland, OH: Cleveland AFL-CIO Federation of Labor/The Greater Cleveland Labor History Society/The Cleveland Citizen, 1987.

Party political offices
New political party	Social Democratic nominee for Vice President of the United States; Withdrew; 1900	Succeeded by Job Harriman
New political party	Farmer-Labor nominee for Vice President of the United States; 1920	Succeeded by William Bouck; Withdrew
Trade union offices
Preceded by Henry Blackmore; Patrick Dolan	American Federation of Labor delegate to the Trades Union Congress; 1903; With: Martin Lawlor	Succeeded by William D. Ryan; Dennis Driscoll
