= Patrick Dolan =

Scottish-born American labor unionist

Patrick Dolan (1858 – October 22, 1910) was a Scottish-born American labor unionist.

== Early life and emigration ==
Born at Coatbridge in Scotland, to Irish parents, Dolan began working at a local colliery at the age of eight. He emigrated to the United States in 1888, settling in McDonald, Pennsylvania, and continuing to work as a miner.

== Union activism ==
There, he joined the United Mine Workers of America, and in 1896, he was elected as the full-time president of the union's District Number 5. The following year, he led a successful strike, during which he was arrested while leading a march. In 1898, Dolan stood to become national vice-president of the union, but was defeated by John Mitchell.

By 1906, Dolan was regarded as a conservative in the movement, opposed to strikes. That year, he denounced Mitchell, who was by then the president of the union. He claimed that Mitchell had held a grudge against him since 1898, that Mitchell's tactics were poor, and that Mitchell had acted in an underhand manner, trying to undermine Dolan. Dolan announced that he would not campaign for re-election as district president, and that he would continue in the post whatever the election result was. He was defeated, but attended the annual district conference, and attempted to call it to order. The meeting unanimously moved to expel him, but he refused to leave until physically removed from the hall.

== Death ==
In 1910, Dolan fell asleep while waiting for a train in Pittsburgh. He awoke as it was leaving the station, and attempted to board the moving train, but instead fell under its wheels and died.

Trade union offices
Preceded by John Cairns	President of District 5 of the United Mine Workers of America; 1896–1906	Succeeded by Frank Feehan
Preceded by Daniel Keefe; Eugene F. O'Rourke	American Federation of Labor delegate to the Trades Union Congress; 1902; With: Henry Blackmore	Succeeded by Max S. Hayes; Martin Lawlor
