= William D. Ryan =

William D. Ryan (1861 – November 17, 1949) was an American labor unionist.

Born in Illinois, Ryan moved with his family to Braidwood, Illinois in 1865. He became a breaker boy at a colliery, and joined the Knights of Labor, and then the United Mine Workers of America. In 1897, he was elected as secretary-treasurer of his local, and became a full-time organizer for the union. In 1908, he was elected as secretary-treasurer of the international union, but he left the union movement in 1909. He then worked as an arbitrator for the Southwestern Interstate Coal Operators' Association, as a safety commissioner for the United States Bureau of Mines, and briefly ran a family coal and grain company.

Ryan retired in 1935, and died in Kansas City, Missouri in 1949.

Trade union offices
Preceded by Max S. Hayes; Martin Lawlor	American Federation of Labor delegate to the Trades Union Congress; 1904; With: Dennis Driscoll	Succeeded by John A. Moffit; James Wood
Preceded by William Bauchop Wilson	Secretary-Treasurer of the United Mine Workers of America; 1908–1909	Succeeded by Edwin Perry
