= 1920 United States presidential election in South Dakota =

- November 2, 1920
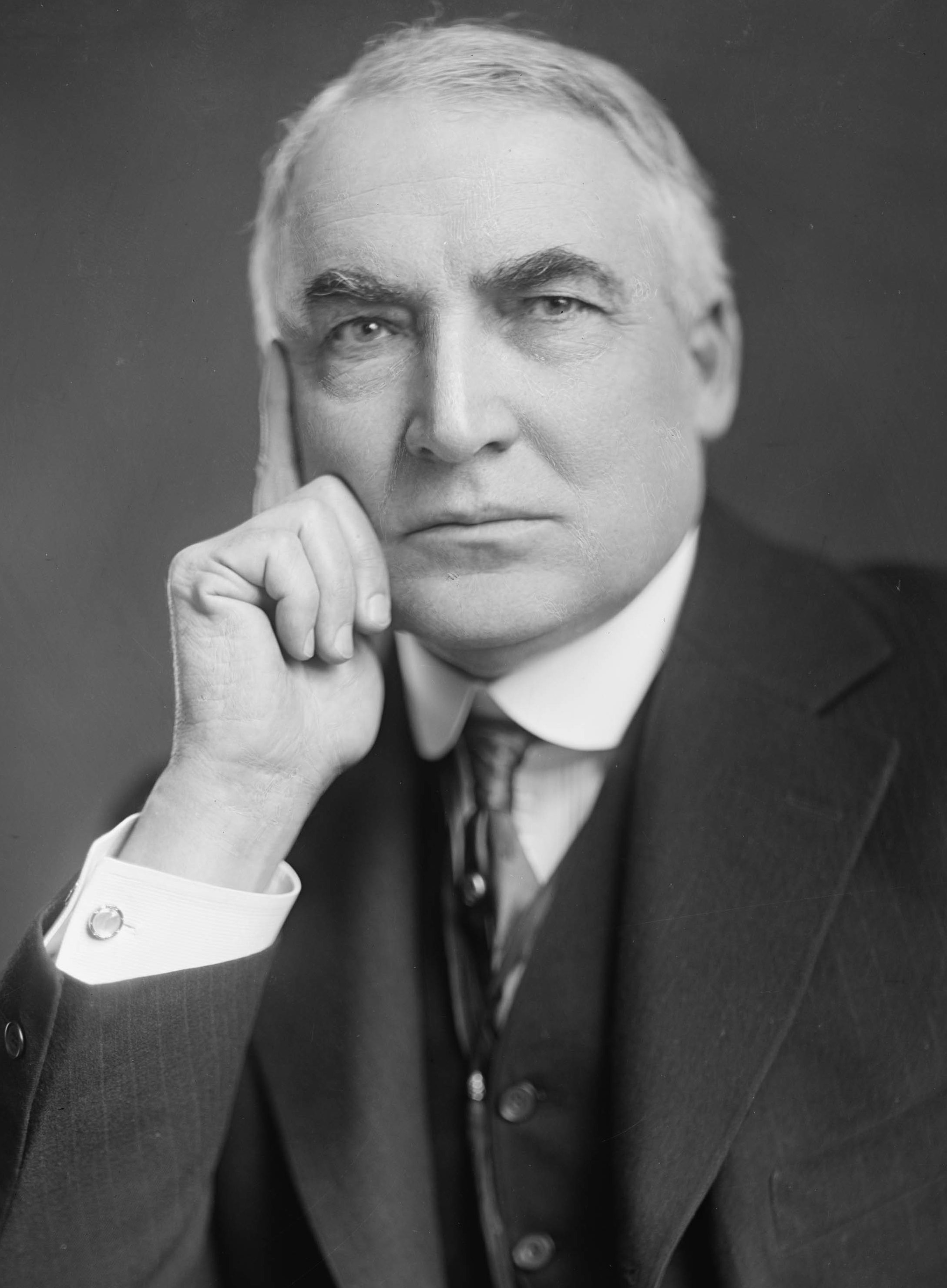

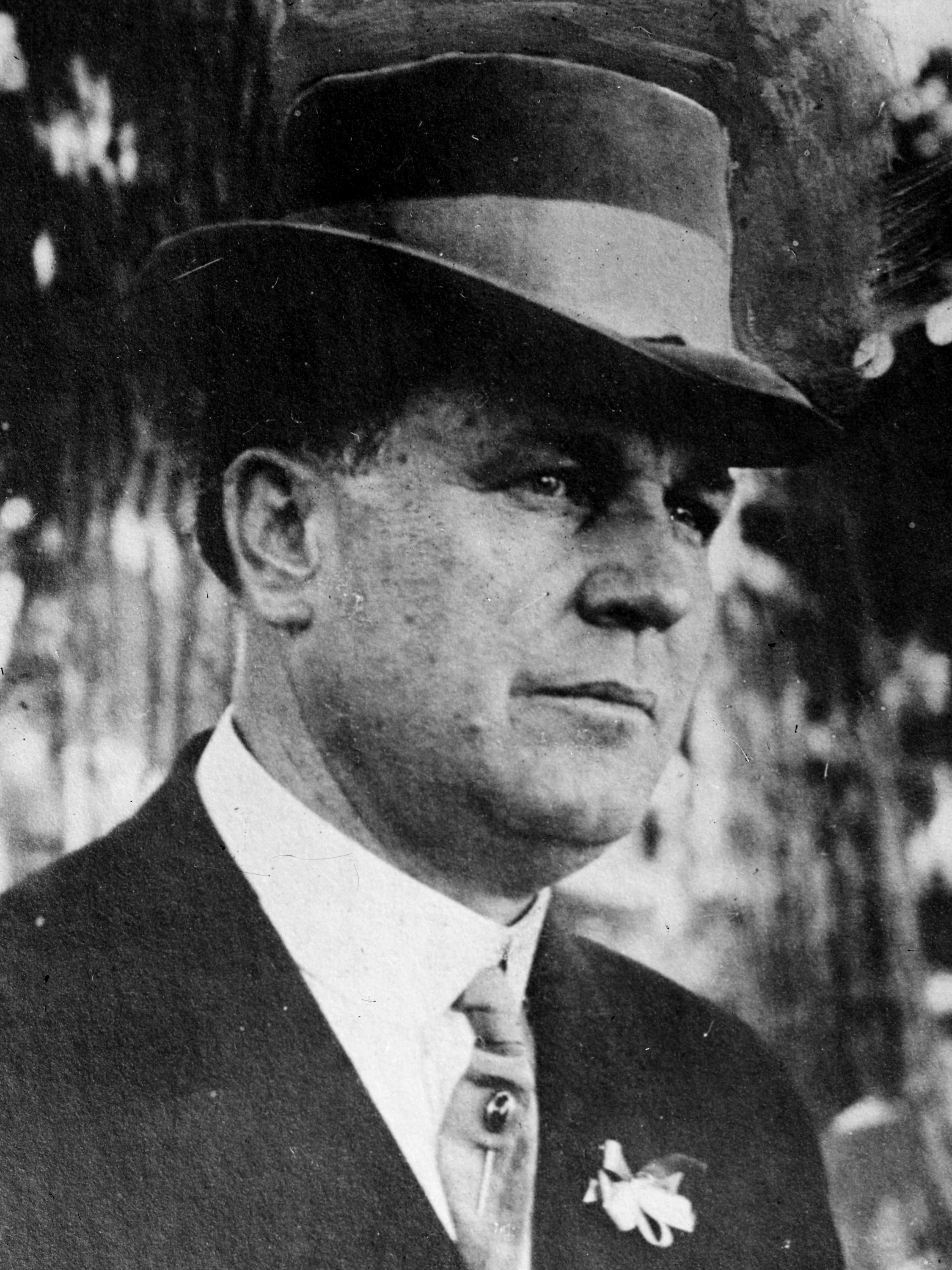
Nominee	Warren G. Harding	James M. Cox	Parley P. Christensen
Party	Republican	Democratic	Nonpartisan League
Alliance			Farmer–Labor
Home state	Ohio	Ohio	Illinois
Running mate	Calvin Coolidge	Franklin D. Roosevelt	Max S. Hayes
Electoral vote	5	0	0
Popular vote	110,692	35,938	34,707
Percentage	60.74%	19.72%	19.04%
County results
Harding
40–50%
50–60%
60–70%
70–80%
President before election
Woodrow Wilson
Democratic
Elected President
Warren G. Harding
Republican

The 1920 United States presidential election in South Dakota took place on November 2, 1920, as part of the 1920 United States presidential election in which all contemporary forty-eight states participated. Voters chose five electors, or representatives to the Electoral College, who voted for president and vice president.

The 1918 mid-term elections had seen the Midwestern farming community largely desert the Democratic Party due to supposed preferential treatment of Southern farmers: Democratic seats in the Midwest fell from thirty-four to seventeen, whilst Scandinavian-Americans were also vigorously opposed to entering the war. Moreover, Democratic fear of Communism seen in the Palmer Raids and "Red Scare" led to Cox, then Governor of Ohio, to ban German-language instruction in public schools in 1919. Much more critical for German-Americans was the view that outgoing President Woodrow Wilson was deliberately trying to punish Germany and Austria for starting the war, especially via his disregard for the United Kingdom's continuing blockade of Germany. Stressing Harding's German ancestry, the German press drummed up the view that "a vote for Harding is a vote against the persecutions suffered by German-Americans during the war."

As the campaign began after the Republican Party had nominated U.S. Senator Warren G. Harding of Ohio and the Democratic Party former Ohio governor James M. Cox, a further blow to the Democrats occurred when the national economy suffered a major downturn following the wartime boom, resulting in plummeting agricultural prices that were especially problematic in the Midwest. Whereas Cox travelled throughout the nation apart from the "Solid South" during September, Harding, despite having four times the budget, campaigned from his home in Marion, Ohio. A poll by the giant Rexall drug store chain – which in 1916 had been accurate enough to predict Wilson's razor-thin wins in New Hampshire and California – suggested Harding would win 382 electoral votes, and at the end of October, although no more opinion polls had been published, most observers were even more convinced that the Republicans would take complete control of all branches of government.

The late-October predictions of a complete takeover of the federal government by the Republican Party were entirely born out. So unpopular was Wilson that – although South Dakota was the only Plains state Wilson had lost in 1916 – Cox lost over half the Wilson vote from that election, and lost every county. In fact, Non Partisan League (Note: In the other eighteen states where Christensen was on the ballot, he was listed under the label of “Farmer-Labor” or “Labor”.) candidate Parley Parker Christensen finished second ahead of Cox in twenty-nine counties and was only 1,231 votes behind the Democratic candidate in South Dakota as a whole. Aided by German Lutheran hostility towards Prohibition, Christensen gained over 41 percent in Hutchinson County, and over thirty percent in three other East River counties.

== Results ==
Presidential Candidate	Running Mate	Party	Electoral Vote (EV)	Popular Vote (PV)	
Warren G. Harding	Calvin Coolidge	Republican	5	110,692	60.74%
James M. Cox	Franklin D. Roosevelt	Democratic	0	35,938	19.72%
Parley P. Christensen	Max S. Hayes	Non Partisan League	0	34,707	19.04%
Aaron S. Watkins	D. Leigh Colvin	Independent	0	900	0.49%

=== Results by county ===
County	Warren G. Harding Republican		James M. Cox Democratic		Parley P. Christensen Nonpartisan League		Aaron S. Watkins Independent		Margin		Total votes cast
County	#	%	#	%	#	%	#	%	#	%	Total votes cast
Aurora	1,004	49.19%	445	21.80%	589	28.86%	3	0.15%	415 (Note: In this county where Cox ran third behind Christensen as well as behind Harding, margin given is Harding vote minus Christensen vote and percentage margin Harding percentage minus Christensen percentage.)	20.33%	2,041
Beadle	2,852	56.54%	925	18.34%	1,240	24.58%	27	0.54%	1,612	31.96%	5,044
Bennett	220	48.67%	199	44.03%	30	6.64%	3	0.66%	21	4.65%	452
Bon Homme	1,872	53.23%	960	27.30%	676	19.22%	9	0.26%	912	25.93%	3,517
Brookings	2,743	68.64%	564	14.11%	613	15.34%	76	1.90%	2,130	53.30%	3,996
Brown	5,581	56.54%	1,364	13.82%	2,893	29.31%	33	0.33%	2,688	27.23%	9,871
Brule	1,036	51.03%	671	33.05%	310	15.27%	13	0.64%	365	17.98%	2,030
Buffalo	200	59.70%	101	30.15%	30	8.96%	4	1.19%	99	29.55%	335
Butte	1,722	54.51%	672	21.27%	741	23.46%	24	0.76%	981	31.05%	3,159
Campbell	1,128	71.26%	67	4.23%	383	24.19%	5	0.32%	745	47.06%	1,583
Charles Mix	2,021	50.17%	1,305	32.40%	696	17.28%	6	0.15%	716	17.78%	4,028
Clark	1,753	60.24%	437	15.02%	692	23.78%	28	0.96%	1,061	36.46%	2,910
Clay	1,885	61.88%	907	29.78%	248	8.14%	6	0.20%	978	32.11%	3,046
Codington	2,706	59.84%	867	19.17%	929	20.54%	20	0.44%	1,777	39.30%	4,522
Corson	1,448	60.89%	484	20.35%	424	17.83%	22	0.93%	964	40.54%	2,378
Custer	784	60.82%	383	29.71%	116	9.00%	6	0.47%	401	31.11%	1,289
Davison	2,605	54.16%	1,105	22.97%	1,073	22.31%	27	0.56%	1,500	31.19%	4,810
Day	2,739	59.82%	436	9.52%	1,378	30.09%	26	0.57%	1,361	29.72%	4,579
Deuel	1,569	69.95%	159	7.09%	498	22.20%	17	0.76%	1,071	47.75%	2,243
Dewey	880	63.31%	335	24.10%	172	12.37%	3	0.22%	545	39.21%	1,390
Douglas	1,247	63.49%	386	19.65%	325	16.55%	6	0.31%	861	43.84%	1,964
Edmunds	1,486	60.36%	283	11.49%	681	27.66%	12	0.49%	805	32.70%	2,462
Fall River	1,236	61.01%	680	33.56%	106	5.23%	4	0.20%	556	27.44%	2,026
Faulk	1,341	65.51%	346	16.90%	353	17.24%	7	0.34%	988	48.27%	2,047
Grant	1,813	59.99%	350	11.58%	856	28.33%	3	0.10%	957	31.67%	3,022
Gregory	1,833	57.61%	744	23.38%	601	18.89%	4	0.13%	1,089	34.22%	3,182
Haakon	713	49.65%	393	27.37%	321	22.35%	9	0.63%	320	22.28%	1,436
Hamlin	1,322	63.68%	337	16.23%	398	19.17%	19	0.92%	924	44.51%	2,076
Hand	1,511	61.08%	655	26.48%	291	11.76%	17	0.69%	856	34.60%	2,474
Hanson	1,001	51.87%	418	21.66%	508	26.32%	3	0.16%	493	25.54%	1,930
Harding	648	58.43%	213	19.21%	241	21.73%	7	0.63%	407	36.70%	1,109
Hughes	1,313	68.31%	433	22.53%	172	8.95%	4	0.21%	880	45.79%	1,922
Hutchinson	1,873	51.15%	243	6.64%	1,528	41.73%	18	0.49%	345	9.42%	3,662
Hyde	710	68.53%	233	22.49%	92	8.88%	1	0.10%	477	46.04%	1,036
Jackson	595	70.58%	206	24.44%	42	4.98%	0	0.00%	389	46.14%	843
Jerauld	1,038	57.03%	357	19.62%	397	21.81%	28	1.54%	641	35.22%	1,820
Jones	609	62.33%	255	26.10%	110	11.26%	3	0.31%	354	36.23%	977
Kingsbury	2,344	71.66%	481	14.70%	429	13.12%	17	0.52%	1,863	56.96%	3,271
Lake	2,333	69.98%	398	11.94%	590	17.70%	13	0.39%	1,743	52.28%	3,334
Lawrence	2,986	68.50%	1,201	27.55%	151	3.46%	21	0.48%	1,785	40.95%	4,359
Lincoln	2,790	73.54%	441	11.62%	555	14.63%	8	0.21%	2,235	58.91%	3,794
Lyman	1,050	59.63%	463	26.29%	244	13.86%	4	0.23%	587	33.33%	1,761
Marshall	1,557	55.97%	266	9.56%	954	34.29%	5	0.18%	603	21.68%	2,782
McCook	1,864	60.52%	565	18.34%	623	20.23%	28	0.91%	1,241	40.29%	3,080
McPherson	1,470	72.92%	112	5.56%	415	20.59%	19	0.94%	1,055	52.33%	2,016
Meade	1,894	58.37%	894	27.55%	436	13.44%	21	0.65%	1,000	30.82%	3,245
Mellette	533	63.53%	261	31.11%	44	5.24%	1	0.12%	272	32.42%	839
Miner	1,450	56.73%	651	25.47%	448	17.53%	7	0.27%	799	31.26%	2,556
Minnehaha	8,290	63.15%	2,534	19.30%	2,220	16.91%	83	0.63%	5,756	43.85%	13,127
Moody	1,667	63.55%	371	14.14%	570	21.73%	15	0.57%	1,097	41.82%	2,623
Pennington	2,568	64.23%	1,205	30.14%	212	5.30%	13	0.33%	1,363	34.09%	3,998
Perkins	1,326	60.41%	417	19.00%	441	20.09%	11	0.50%	885	40.32%	2,195
Potter	1,073	72.30%	255	17.18%	140	9.43%	16	1.08%	818	55.12%	1,484
Roberts	2,335	49.73%	447	9.52%	1,889	40.23%	24	0.51%	446	9.50%	4,695
Sanborn	1,125	49.89%	517	22.93%	594	26.34%	19	0.84%	531	23.55%	2,255
Spink	2,923	65.09%	785	17.48%	760	16.92%	23	0.51%	2,138	47.61%	4,491
Stanley	598	56.79%	394	37.42%	58	5.51%	3	0.28%	204	19.37%	1,053
Sully	542	62.95%	147	17.07%	170	19.74%	2	0.23%	372	43.21%	861
Tripp	1,819	59.33%	968	31.57%	275	8.97%	4	0.13%	851	27.76%	3,066
Turner	2,703	67.59%	604	15.10%	689	17.23%	3	0.08%	2,014	50.36%	3,999
Union	1,942	66.17%	841	28.65%	142	4.84%	10	0.34%	1,101	37.51%	2,935
Walworth	1,411	61.40%	478	20.80%	398	17.32%	11	0.48%	933	40.60%	2,298
Yankton	2,555	61.80%	1,147	27.75%	420	10.16%	12	0.29%	1,408	34.06%	4,134
Ziebach	507	65.42%	177	22.84%	87	11.23%	4	0.52%	330	42.58%	775
Totals	110,692	60.74%	35,938	19.72%	34,707	19.04%	900	0.49%	74,754	41.02%	182,237

== See also ==
- United States presidential elections in South Dakota
