= Martin Lawlor (labor unionist) =

Irish-American labor union leader

Martin Lawlor (November 27, 1868 – September 2, 1959) was an Irish-born American labor union leader.

Born in County Kerry, in Ireland, Lawlor emigrated to the United States in 1885 or 1886. He settled in Bethel, Connecticut, where he completed an apprenticeship as a hatter, and joined the Bethel Hat Makers' Union, becoming its secretary in 1890. He remained secretary when the union became the National Hat Makers' Association of the United States. In 1896, it merged into the United Hatters of North America, and Lawlor served on the new union's executive board.

In 1898, Lawlor was elected as vice-president of the union, then in 1904 as its secretary; from 1911, its secretary-treasurer. He led a boycott of D. E. Loewe & Company, an anti-union fur hat manufacturer, which sued him for violating the Sherman Antitrust Act. The lengthy case, Loewe v. Lawlor, was eventually resolved in Loewe's favor, with total damages of $290,000.

In 1934, the union went into another merger which formed the United Hatters', Cap, and Millinery Workers' International Union, with Lawlor becoming its vice-president and secretary-treasurer of its Men's Hat Department. In 1936, he instead became the union's label secretary. He held this post until June 1959, when it was abolished, and he became an honorary officer. He died later in the year.

Trade union offices
Preceded by Henry Blackmore; Patrick Dolan	American Federation of Labor delegate to the Trades Union Congress; 1903; With: Max S. Hayes	Succeeded by William D. Ryan; Dennis Driscoll
Preceded by John Phillips	Secretary-Treasurer of the United Hatters of North America; 1904–1934	Succeeded by Union merged
