= 1920 United States presidential election =

Election of Warren G. Harding

- November 2, 1920

531 members of the Electoral College 266 electoral votes needed to win
- Turnout: 49.2% (▼12.6 pp)
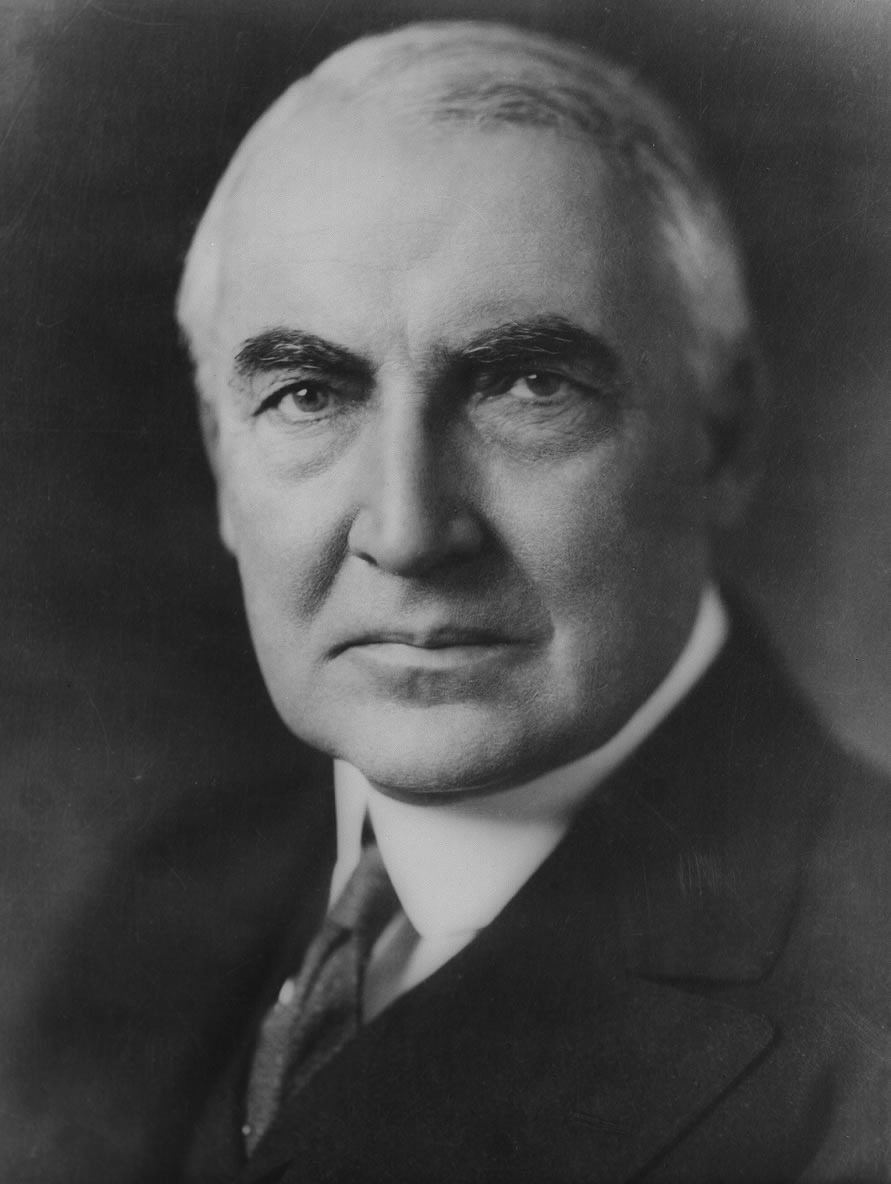

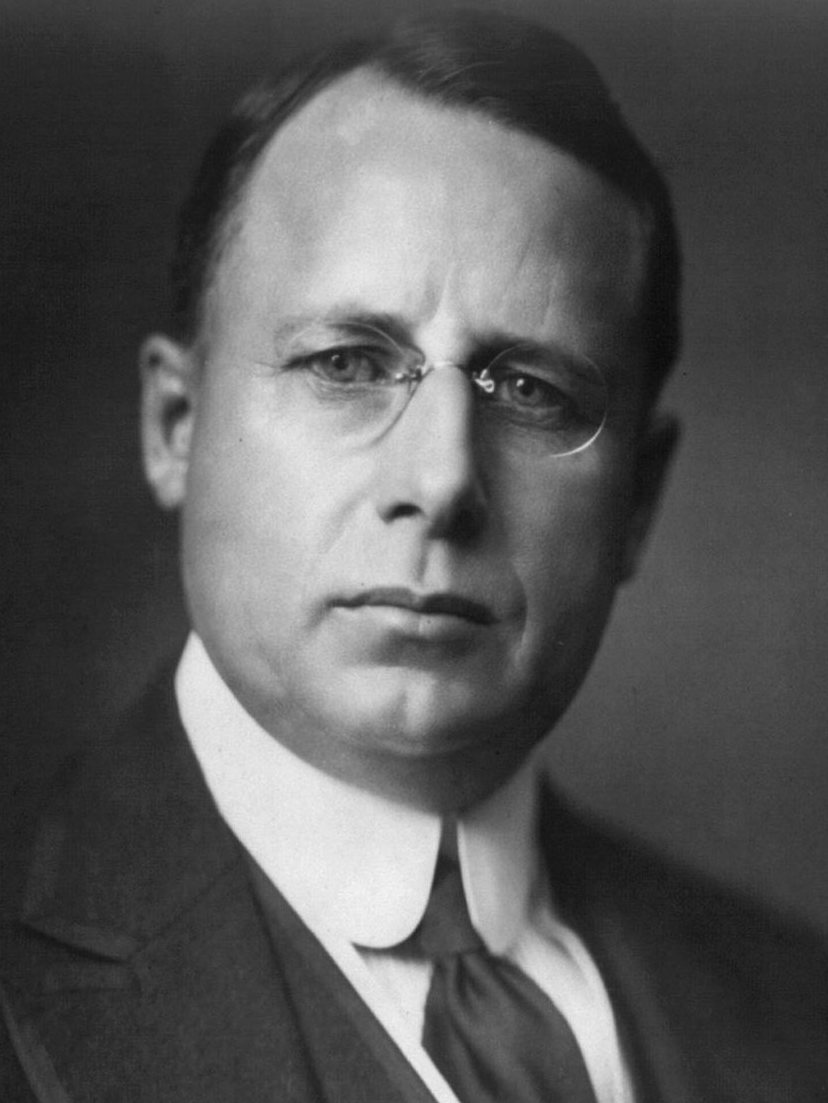
Nominee	Warren G. Harding	James M. Cox
Party	Republican	Democratic
Home state	Ohio	Ohio
Running mate	Calvin Coolidge	Franklin D. Roosevelt
Electoral vote	404	127
States carried	37	11
Popular vote	16,166,126	9,140,256
Percentage	60.3%	34.1%
- Presidential election results map. Red denotes states won by Harding/Coolidge, blue denotes those won by Cox/Roosevelt. Numbers indicate the number of electoral votes allotted to each state.
President before election
Woodrow Wilson
Democratic
Elected President
Warren G Harding
Republican

Woodrow Wilson, the incumbent president in 1920, whose second term expired on March 4, 1921

A presidential election was held in the United States on November 2, 1920. The Republican ticket of senator Warren G. Harding of Ohio and governor Calvin Coolidge of Massachusetts defeated the Democratic ticket of governor James M. Cox of Ohio and assistant secretary Franklin D. Roosevelt of New York in one of the largest landslides in American presidential electoral history. It was the first election held after the end of the First World War, and the first election after the ratification of the Nineteenth Amendment gave nationwide suffrage to women.

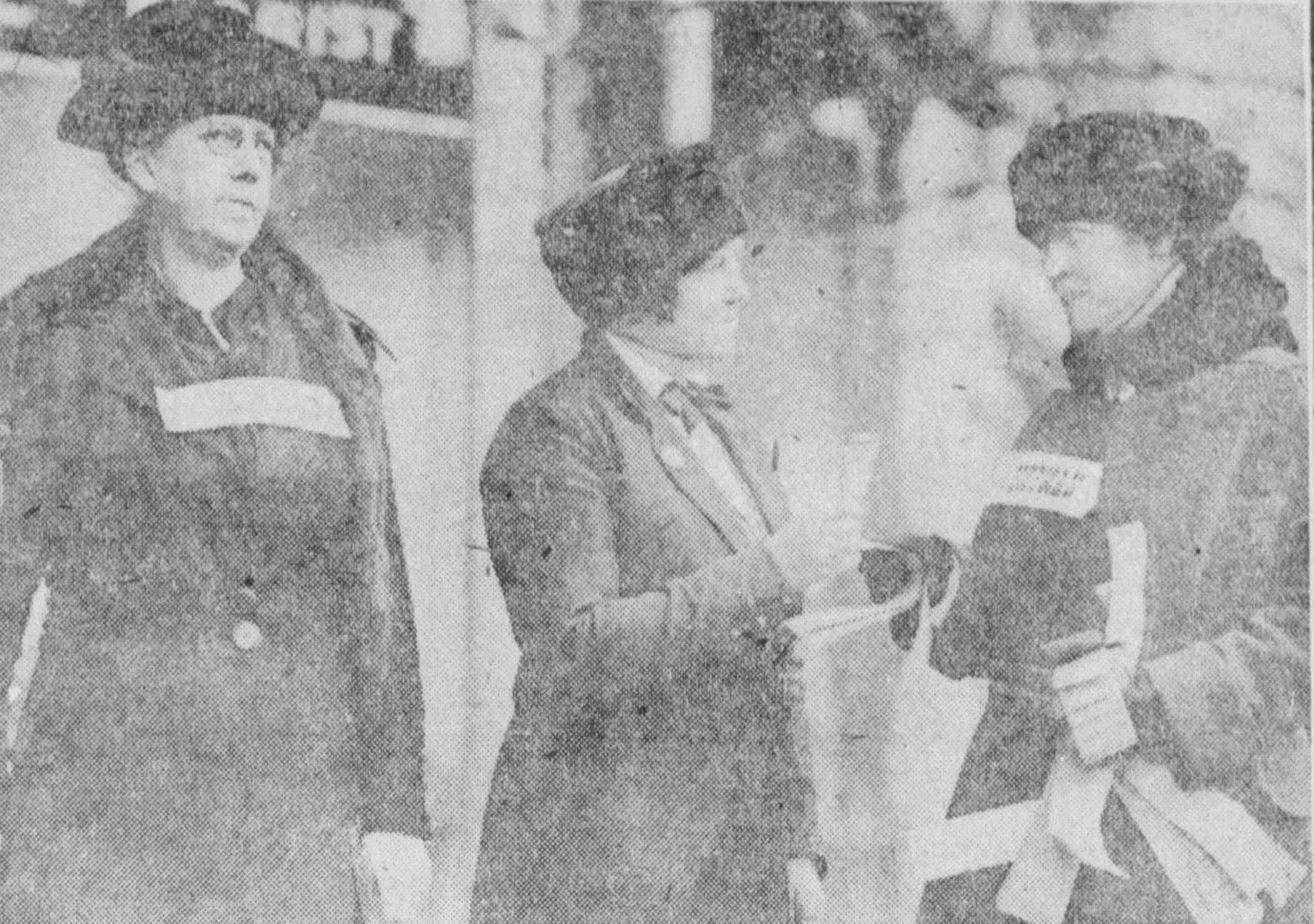
Women cast votes in Cincinnati in the first presidential election after the Nineteenth Amendment extended suffrage to women

Incumbent President Woodrow Wilson, a Democrat who had served since 1913, privately hoped for a third term despite severe physical and mental disabilities from a stroke, but he had very little support. Former president Theodore Roosevelt had been the frontrunner for the Republican nomination, but he died in 1919 without leaving an obvious heir to his progressive legacy. The major parties turned to little-known dark horse candidates from the state of Ohio, a populous swing state with many electoral votes. Cox won on the 44th ballot at the 1920 Democratic National Convention, defeating William Gibbs McAdoo (Wilson's son-in-law), A. Mitchell Palmer, and several other candidates. Harding emerged as a compromise candidate between the conservative and progressive wings of the Republican party, and he clinched his nomination on the tenth ballot at the 1920 Republican National Convention.

The election was dominated by the American social and political environment in the aftermath of World War I, which was marked by a hostile response to certain aspects of Wilson's foreign policy and a massive reaction against the reformist zeal of the Progressive Era. The wartime economic boom had collapsed and the country was deep in a recession. Wilson's advocacy for America's entry into the League of Nations, in the face of a return to non-interventionist opinion, challenged his effectiveness as president, and there were wars and revolutions overseas. At home, the year 1919 was marked by major strikes in the meatpacking and steel industries and large-scale race riots in Chicago and other cities. Additionally, the September 16, 1920, Wall Street bombing aroused fears of radicals and terrorists. The Irish Catholic and German communities were outraged at Wilson's perceived support of their traditional enemy, Great Britain.

Harding all but ignored Cox in the race, and essentially campaigned against Wilson by calling for a "return to normalcy". Harding won a landslide victory, sweeping every state outside of the South and becoming the first Republican since the end of Reconstruction to win a former state of the Confederacy: Tennessee. Harding's victory margin of 26.2 percent in the popular vote remains the largest popular-vote percentage margin ever since widespread popular elections began in the 1820s. (Note: Subsequent winning candidates in 1936, 1964, and 1972 exceeded his share of the popular vote.) Cox won just 34.1 percent of the popular vote, and Socialist Eugene V. Debs won 3.4 percent, despite being in prison at the time. It was the first election in which women had the right to vote in all 48 states, which caused the total popular vote to increase dramatically, from 18.5 million in 1916 to 26.8 million in 1920.

It was the third presidential election in which both major party candidates were registered in the same home state (the others have been in 1860, 1904, 1940, 1944, and 2016). Coincidentally, the election was held on Harding's 55th birthday.

Both major-party vice-presidential nominees would later succeed to the presidency: Calvin Coolidge (Republican) upon Harding's death in 1923 and Franklin D. Roosevelt (Democratic) after defeating Republican president Herbert Hoover in 1932. In contrast, the incumbent vice president, Thomas R. Marshall, entered his name for the Democratic nomination in this election but ultimately did not receive it, making this election the last time where the incumbent vice president ran for his party's nomination for president and lost.

== Nominations ==
=== Republican Party nomination ===
Republican Party (United States) 1920 Republican Party ticket
Warren G. Harding	Calvin Coolidge
for President	for Vice President
United States Senator from Ohio (1915–1921)	48th Governor of Massachusetts (1919–1921)
ID: 39 votes HCV: 692.2 votes 144,762 votes

==== Other candidates ====
Candidates in this section are sorted by their highest vote count on the nominating ballots
Leonard Wood	Frank Orren Lowden	Hiram Johnson	William Cameron Sproul	Nicholas Murray Butler	Calvin Coolidge
Chief of Staff of the Army from New Hampshire (1910–1914)	Governor of Illinois (1917–1921)	U.S. Senator from California (1917–1945)	Governor of Pennsylvania (1919–1923)	Columbia University President from New York (1902–1945)	Governor of Massachusetts (1919–1921)
ID: 145 votes HCV: 314.5 votes 710,863 votes	ID: 78 votes HCV: 311.5 votes 389,127 votes	ID: 110 votes HCV: 148 votes 965,651 votes	ID: 0 votes HCV: 84 votes 0 votes	ID: 0 votes HCV: 69.5 votes 0 votes	ID: 0 votes HCV: 34 votes 0 votes
Robert M. La Follette	Jeter Pritchard	Miles Poindexter	Howard Sutherland	Herbert Hoover	
U.S. Senator from Wisconsin (1906–1925)	Court of Appeals Judge from North Carolina (1904–1921)	U.S. Senator from Washington (1911–1923)	U.S. Senator from West Virginia (1917–1923)	Director of the U.S. Food Administration from California (1917–1918)	
ID: 0 votes NFN; HCV: 24 votes 0 votes	ID: 17 votes HCV: 21 votes 0 votes	ID: 14 votes HCV: 20 votes 3,806 votes	ID: 0 votes HCV: 17 votes 33,849 votes	ID: 0 votes HCV: 10.5 votes 303,815 votes	

Following the return of former president Theodore Roosevelt to the Republican Party after the previous election, speculation quickly grew as to whether he would make another run for the presidency. Roosevelt's health declined seriously in 1918, however, and he died on January 6, 1919. Attention then turned to the party's unsuccessful 1916 candidate, Charles Evans Hughes, who had run Wilson close that year, but Hughes remained aloof as to the prospect of another run, and ultimately ruled himself out following the death of his daughter early in 1920.

On June 8, the Republican National Convention met in Chicago. The race was wide open, and soon the convention deadlocked between Major General Leonard Wood and Governor Frank Orren Lowden of Illinois.

Other names placed in nomination included Senators Warren G. Harding from Ohio, Hiram Johnson from California, and Miles Poindexter from Washington, Governor Calvin Coolidge of Massachusetts, philanthropist Herbert Hoover from California, and Columbia University President Nicholas M. Butler. Senator Robert M. La Follette from Wisconsin was not formally placed in nomination, but received the votes of his state delegation nonetheless. Harding was nominated for president on the tenth ballot, after some delegates shifted their allegiances. The results of the ten ballots were as follows:

Presidential Balloting, Republican National Convention 1920
Ballot	1	2	3	4	5	6	7	8	9	10 Before shifts	10 After shifts
Warren G. Harding	65.5	59.0	58.5	61.5	78.0	89.0	105.0	133.0	374.5	644.7	692.2
Leonard Wood	287.5	289.5	303.0	314.5	299.0	311.5	312.0	299.0	249.0	181.5	156.0
Frank Orren Lowden	211.5	259.5	282.5	289.0	303.0	311.5	311.5	307.0	121.5	28.0	11.0
Hiram Johnson	133.5	146.0	148.0	140.5	133.5	110.0	99.5	87.0	82.0	80.8	80.8
William Cameron Sproul	84.0	78.5	79.5	79.5	82.5	77.0	76.0	76.0	78.0	0	0
Nicholas Murray Butler	69.5	41.0	25.0	20.0	4.0	4.0	2.0	2.0	2.0	2.0	2.0
Calvin Coolidge	34.0	32.0	27.0	25.0	29.0	28.0	28.0	30.0	28.0	5.0	5.0
Robert M. La Follette	24.0	24.0	24.0	22.0	24.0	24.0	24.0	24.0	24.0	24.0	24.0
Jeter Connelly Pritchard	21.0	10.0	0	0	0	0	0	0	0	0	0
Miles Poindexter	20.0	15.0	15.0	15.0	15.0	15.0	15.0	15.0	14.0	2.0	0
Howard Sutherland	17.0	15.0	9.0	3.0	1.0	0	0	0	0	0	0
Herbert Hoover	5.5	5.5	5.5	5.0	6.0	5.0	4.0	5.0	6.0	10.5	9.5
Scattering	11.0	9.0	7.0	9.0	9.0	9.0	6.0	6.0	5.0	5.5	3.5

First Presidential Ballot

Second Presidential Ballot

Third Presidential Ballot

Fourth Presidential Ballot

Fifth Presidential Ballot

Sixth Presidential Ballot

Seventh Presidential Ballot

Eighth Presidential Ballot

Ninth Presidential Ballot

Tenth Presidential Ballot
Before Shifts

Tenth Presidential Ballot
After Shifts

Harding's nomination, said to have been secured in negotiations among party bosses in a "smoke-filled room," was engineered by Harry M. Daugherty, Harding's political manager, who became United States Attorney General after his election. Before the convention, Daugherty was quoted as saying, "I don't expect Senator Harding to be nominated on the first, second, or third ballots, but I think we can afford to take chances that about 11 minutes after two, Friday morning of the convention, when 15 or 12 weary men are sitting around a table, someone will say: 'Who will we nominate?' At that decisive time, the friends of Harding will suggest him and we can well afford to abide by the result." Daugherty's prediction described essentially what occurred, but historians Richard C. Bain and Judith H. Parris argue that Daugherty's prediction has been given too much weight in narratives of the convention.

Once the presidential nomination was finally settled, the party bosses and Sen. Harding recommended Wisconsin Sen. Irvine Lenroot to the delegates for the second spot, but the delegates revolted and nominated Coolidge, who was very popular over his handling of the Boston police strike from the year before. The tally:

Vice Presidential Balloting, Republican Nat'l Convention 1920
Calvin Coolidge	674.5
Irvine Lenroot	146.5
Henry Justin Allen	68.5
Henry W. Anderson	28
Asle Gronna	24
Hiram Johnson	22.5
Jeter Connelly Pritchard	11
Abstaining	9

Source for convention coverage: Richard C. Bain and Judith H. Parris, Convention Decisions and Voting Records (Washington DC: Brookings Institution, 1973), pp. 200–208.

=== Democratic Party nomination ===
Democratic Party (United States) 1920 Democratic Party ticket
James M. Cox	Franklin D. Roosevelt
for President	for Vice President
46th & 48th Governor of Ohio (1913–1915 & 1917–1921)	Assistant Secretary of the Navy (1913–1920)
ID: 74 votes HCV: 699.5 votes 86,194 votes

==== Other candidates ====
Candidates in this section are sorted by their highest vote count on the nominating ballots
William Gibbs McAdoo	Mitchell Palmer	Al Smith	John W. Davis	Edward Edwards	Robert Latham Owen
U.S. Secretary of the Treasury from California (1913–1918)	U.S. Attorney General from Pennsylvania (1919–1921)	Governor of New York (1919–1920)	Ambassador to Britain from West Virginia (1918–1921)	Governor of New Jersey (1920–1923)	U.S. Senator from Oklahoma (1907–1925)
ID: 0 votes HCV: 467 votes 74,987 votes	ID: 104 votes HCV: 267 votes 140,010 votes	ID: 0 votes HCV: 109 votes 0 votes	ID: 0 votes HCV: 71.5 votes 0 votes	ID: 28 votes HCV: 42 votes 28,470 votes	ID: 20 votes HCV: 41 votes 0 votes
Thomas Marshall	Edwin T. Meredith	Carter Glass	Homer Cummings	Furnifold Simmons	James Gerard
U.S. Vice President from Indiana (1913–1921)	U.S. Secretary of Agriculture from Iowa (1920–1921)	U.S. Senator from Virginia (1920–1946)	Chair of the DNC from Connecticut (1919–1920)	U.S. Senator from North Carolina (1901–1931)	Ambassador to Germany from New York (1913–1917)
ID: 0 votes NFN; HCV: 37 votes 0 votes	ID: 0 votes HCV: 28 votes 0 votes	ID: 24 votes HCV: 27 votes 0 votes	ID: 0 votes HCV: 27 votes 0 votes	ID: 0 votes HCV: 25 votes 0 votes	ID: 10 votes HCV: 21 votes 4,706 votes
John Sharp Williams	Gilbert Hitchcock	Francis Harrison			
U.S. Senator from Mississippi (1911–1923)	U.S. Senator from Nebraska (1911–1923)	Philippine Governor-General from New York (1913–1921)			
ID: 0 votes NFN; HCV: 20 votes 0 votes	ID: 0 votes HCV: 18 votes 37,452 votes	ID: 0 votes HCV: 6 votes 0 votes			

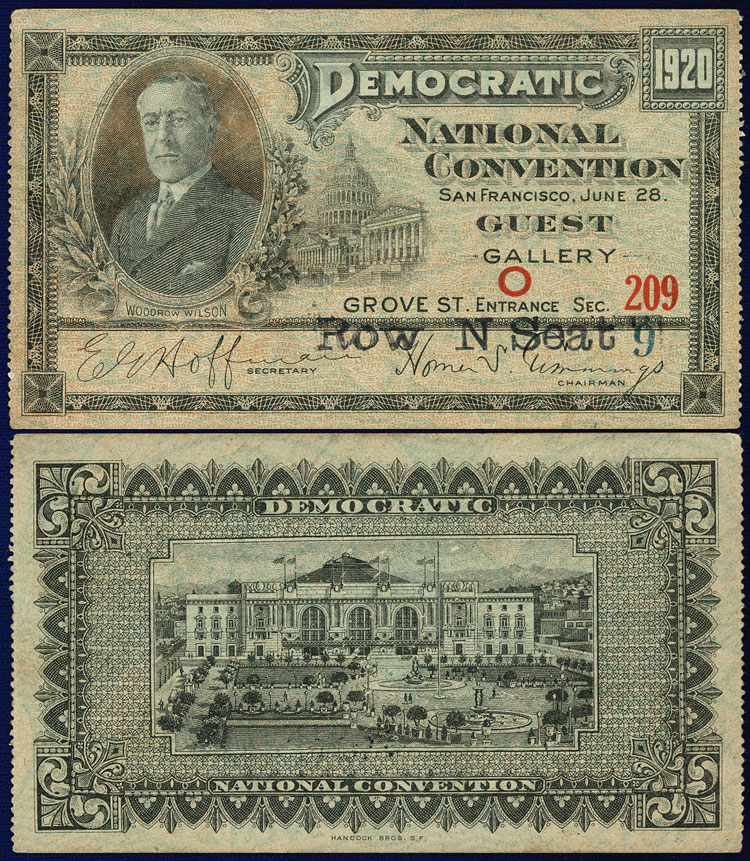
A ticket purchased by a guest of the Democratic National Convention in San Francisco.

It was widely accepted prior to the election that President Woodrow Wilson would not run for a third term, and certainly would not be nominated if he did so. While Vice President Thomas R. Marshall long had desired to succeed Wilson, his indecisive handling of the situation around Wilson's illness and incapacity destroyed any credibility he had as a candidate, and in the end he did not formally put himself forward for the nomination.

Although William Gibbs McAdoo (Wilson's son-in-law and former Treasury Secretary) was the strongest candidate, Wilson blocked his nomination in hopes a deadlocked convention would demand that he run for a third term, even though he was seriously ill, physically immobile, and in seclusion at the time. The Democrats, meeting in San Francisco between June 28 and July 6 (the first time a major party held its nominating convention in an urban center on the Pacific coast), nominated another newspaper editor from Ohio, Governor James M. Cox, as their presidential candidate, and 38-year-old Assistant Secretary of the Navy Franklin D. Roosevelt, a fifth cousin and nephew by marriage of the late president Theodore Roosevelt, for vice-president.

Early favorites for the nomination had included McAdoo and Attorney General Alexander Mitchell Palmer. Others placed in nomination included New York governor Al Smith, United Kingdom ambassador John W. Davis, New Jersey governor Edward I. Edwards, and Oklahoma senator Robert Latham Owen. (The party would nominate Davis and Smith, in that order, as its next two presidential candidates.)

(23–44)	Presidential Ballot																					
	23rd	24th	25th	26th	27th	28th	29th	30th	31st	32nd	33rd	34th	35th	36th	37th	38th	39th	40th	41st	42nd	43rd	44th
James M. Cox	425	429	424	424.5	423.5	423	404.5	400.5	391.5	391	380.5	379.5	376.5	377	386	383.5	468.5	490	497.5	540.5	568	699.5
William Gibbs McAdoo	364.5	364.5	364.5	371	371.5	368.5	394.5	403.5	415.5	421	421	420.5	409	399	405	405.5	440	467	460	427	412	270
A. Mitchell Palmer	181.5	177	169	167	166.5	165.5	166	165	174	176	180	184	222	241	202.5	211	74	19	12	8	7	1
John W. Davis	50.5	54.5	58.5	55.5	60.5	62.5	63	58	57.5	55.5	56	54	33	28	50.5	50	71.5	76	55.5	49.5	57.5	52
Robert L. Owen	34	33	34	33	34	35.5	33	33	34	34	34	37	38.5	36	33	33	32	33	35	34	34	34
Carter Glass	25	25	25	25	25	24	24	24	12.5	9.5	13	7.5	5	4	1	1	0	0	24	24	5.5	1.5
Homer Cummings	5	5	4	3	3	4	4	4	3	3	3	3	3	3	3	4	2	2	2	3	2	0
Champ Clark	2	2	2	3	2	2	2	2	2	2	2.5	2.5	2	2	2	3	2	2	2	2	2	0
Annette Abbott Adams	0	0	0	0	0	0	0	0	0	0	0	0	0	0	1	0	0	0	0	0	0	0
Eugene C. Bonniwell	0	0	0	1	0	0	0	0	0	0	0	0	0	0	1	0	0	0	0	0	0	0
William Jennings Bryan	0	0	0	1	0	0	0	0	0	0	0	0	0	0	0	0	0	0	0	0	0	0
Laura Clay	0	0	0	0	0	0	0	0	0	0	1	0	0	0	0	0	0	0	0	0	0	0
Irvin S. Cobb	1.5	0	0	0	0	0	0	0	0	0	0	0	0	0	0	0	0	0	0	0	0	0
Bainbridge Colby	0	0	0	0	0	0	0	0	0	0	0	0	0	0	0	0	1	1	1	1	1	1
Josephus Daniels	0	0	0	0	0	0	0	0	1	0	0	0	0	0	0	0	0	0	0	0	0	0
Walker Hines	0	0	0	0	0	1	0	0	0	0	0	0	0	0	0	0	0	0	0	0	0	0
Andrieus A. Jones	0	0	0	1	0	0	0	0	0	0	0	0	0	0	0	0	0	0	0	0	0	0
Ring Lardner	0.5	0	0	0	0	0	0	0	0	0	0	0	0	0	0	0	0	0	0	0	0	0
James H. Lewis	0	0	0	1	0	0	0	0	0	0	0	0	0	0	6	0	0	0	0	0	0	0
Thomas R. Marshall	0	0	0	0	1	0	0	0	1	0	0	0	0	0	0	0	0	0	0	0	0	0
John J. Pershing	0	0	1	0	0	0	0	0	0	0	0	0	0	0	0	0	0	0	0	0	0	0
Joseph T. Robinson	0	0	0	0	1	0	0	0	0	0	0	0	0	0	0	0	0	0	0	0	0	0
Cora Wilson Stewart	0	0	0	0	0	0	0	0	0	0	0	0	0	1	0	0	0	0	0	0	0	0
Oscar Underwood	0	1	9	9	4	6	1	2	0	0	0	0	0	0	0	0	0	0	0	0	0	0

== Other candidates ==
=== Socialist Party ===
Socialist Party of America 1920 Socialist Party ticket
Eugene V. Debs	Seymour Stedman
for President	for Vice President
Indiana state representative (1885–1887)	Illinois state representative (1913–1915)

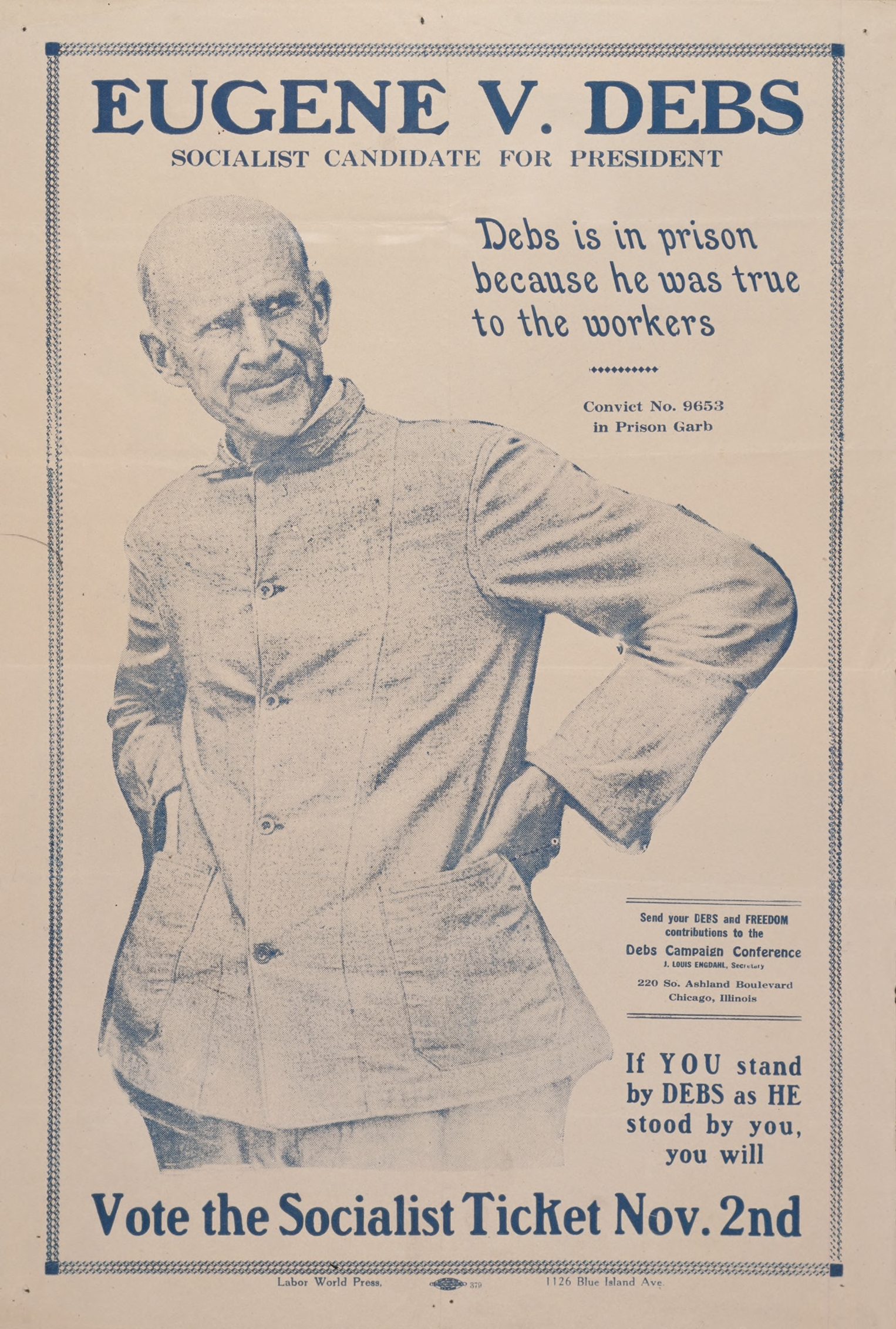
Socialist Party campaign poster featuring Eugene V. Debs in his prison uniform

Socialist Party candidate Eugene V. Debs was incarcerated at the Atlanta federal penitentiary at the time for advocating non-compliance with the draft during World War I. He received the largest number of popular votes ever received by a Socialist Party candidate in the United States, although not the largest percentage of the popular vote. Debs received double this percentage in 1912. The 1920 election was Debs's fifth and last attempt to become president.

In 1919, members of the Socialist Party who had come from Russian language federation of the party and other more radical groups within the party started to create their own papers and membership dues and cards. These members supported a platform that was similar to the Communist International and elected twelve of their members to the fifteen-member National Executive Committee. However, there was accusations of election irregularities and an Emergency Convention held on August 30, 1919, suspended seven of the party's twelve language federations and expelled the party affiliates in Michigan, Massachusetts, and Ohio. The more radical members of the party held a convention in New York City in June 1919, which was attended by 94 delegates from twenty states. A vote to create a new party was defeated by a vote of 55 to 38, causing 31 delegates to withdraw from the convention. These 31 delegates held their own convention in Chicago on September 1, where they founded the Communist Party USA. The Communist Party USA attempted to give its presidential

nomination to Debs, but he declined the nomination.

The Socialist Party held its 1919 convention in Chicago with 140 delegates in attendance. Twenty-six delegates, who were members of the party's left wing, left the convention. These delegates attempted to unite with the Communist Party USA, but formed the Communist Labor Party of America on September 2, after those attempts failed.

The Socialist Party had 100,000 members before the splits, but it fell to 55,000 members while the Communist Party had 35,000 members and the Communist Labor Party had 10,000 members. The Communist Party claimed to have 60,000 members while the Communist Labor Party claimed to have 30,000 members. The United Communist Party was formed in May 1920 between the Communist Labor Party and some members of the Communist Party. The United Communist Party and the Communist Party united in December 1921 to form the Workers Party of America.

Edward Henry, who was a friend of Debs, Lena Morrow Lewis, and Oscar Ameringer, nominated Debs for the party's nomination on May 13, 1920, and the 134 delegates to the national convention voted unanimously to give him the nomination. Kate Richards O'Hare, who was also in prison, was considered for the vice-presidential nomination, but Seymour Stedman was selected by a vote of 106 to 26, which was later made unanimous, to have one of the candidates campaign. James H. Maurer was also considered for the vice-presidential nomination, but he declined due to his duties as head of the Pennsylvania Federation of Labor. Debs accepted the presidential nomination in an Atlanta prison on May 29, after being notified by Seymour, James Oneal, and Julius Gerber.

During the campaign the Socialists had four airplanes drop socialist literature over Toledo, Ohio. The wife of Charles Edward Russell claimed that the ghost of Susan B. Anthony told her to vote for Debs. Over 60,000 people donated to the Socialist Party's campaign fund. Gerber predicted that Debs would receive three million votes and that five Socialists would be elected to Congress. Debs received 913,693 votes with his largest amount of support coming from New York. His vote total was over 50 percent more than what Allan L. Benson had received in the 1916 election. Debs later chose to not run for president in the 1924 election and instead supported Robert M. La Follette.

Presidential Ballot
Eugene V. Debs	132

=== Farmer-Labor Party ===
1920 Farmer-Labor Party ticket
Parley P. Christensen	Max S. Hayes
for President	for Vice President
State Representative from Utah (1915–1917)	Editor of the Cleveland Citizen from Ohio

==== Other candidates ====
Candidates in this section are sorted by their highest vote count on the nominating ballots
Dudley Field Malone	Eugene V. Debs	Henry Ford	Lynn Frazier
Collector of the Port of New York from New York (1913–1913)	State Representative from Indiana (1885–1887)	President of the Ford Motor Company from Michigan (1906–1919)	Governor of North Dakota (1917–1921)
HCV: 174.6 votes	HCV: 68 votes	HCV: 12.3 votes	DN; HCV: 9 votes
Herbert S. Bigelow	Louis F. Post	Jane Addams	Robert M. La Follette
Clergyman from Ohio	Asst U. S. Secretary of Labor from New York (1913–1921)	Co-founder of Hull House from Illinois	U.S. Senator from Wisconsin (1906–1925)
HCV: 7 votes	HCV: 1.7 votes	HCV: 0 votes	DN

=== Prohibition Party ===
1920 Prohibition Party ticket
Aaron S. Watkins	D. Leigh Colvin
for President	for Vice President
Professor and Methodist Minister from Ohio	American politician from New York
Campaign

==== Other candidates ====
Candidates in this section are sorted by their highest vote count on the nominating ballots
Robert H. Patton	Daniel A. Poling	Charles Hiram Randall	William Jennings Bryan
Prohibition Party Convention Chair (1916)	Itinerant Minister from Pennsylvania	Congressman from California (1915–1921)	U.S. Secretary of State from Nebraska (1913–1915)
HCV: 85 votes	HCV: 28 votes	HCV: 9 votes	DN

Meeting in Lincoln, Nebraska, there was some question whether the Prohibition Party would field an independent ticket as opposed to endorsing either Harding or Cox, but this was predicated on either making a clear statement that they would not move to weaken the Eighteenth Amendment; neither chose to make any such commitment. The ticket favored by most present was that of William Jennings Bryan for president and William "Billy" Sunday for vice president, and indeed when a motion was made to nominate Bryan by acclamation, of the more than two hundred present it was only opposed by six. Upon hearing of his nomination, however, Bryan declined the gesture, not wishing to remain singularly focused on the prohibition question or to sever his ties with the Democratic Party entirely. Some had considered Billy Sunday a possible substitute but Sunday was "satisfied" with Republican nominee Warren Harding, while others thought about potentially nominating Henry Ford as their standard-bearer. With the nomination thrown wide open, the party ultimately opted to nominate keynote speaker and Methodist minister Aaron Watkins of Ohio, over other candidates such as 1916 Convention Chair Robert Patton of Illinois, itinerant minister Daniel Poling of Pennsylvania, and Congressman Charles Randall of California. Historian David Leigh Colvin of New York was nominated for the vice presidency.

Presidential Balloting			Vice-Presidential Balloting	
Ballot	1	2	Ballot	1
Aaron S. Watkins	85.0	108.0	D. Leigh Colvin	108.0
Robert H. Patton	85.0	74.0	Herman P. Faris	47.0
Daniel A. Poling	28.0	24.0	Frank S. Regan	15.0
Charles H. Randall	9.0	2.0	James H. Woertendyke	12.0

=== American Party ===
James E. Ferguson, a former governor of Texas, announced his candidacy on April 21, 1920, in Temple, Texas, under the badge of "American Party". Ferguson was opposed to Democrats whom he saw as too controlled by elite academic interests as seen when Woodrow Wilson endorsed rival Thomas H. Ball in the gubernatorial primary, and hoped to help the Republicans carry Texas for the first time (Texas never went Republican during Reconstruction). Initially Ferguson and running mate William J. Hough hoped to carry their campaign to other states, but Ferguson was unable to get on the ballot anywhere outside of Texas. Ferguson did manage to gain almost 10 percent of the vote in Texas, and won eleven counties in the southeast of the state.

== General election ==
=== Return to normalcy ===
Warren G. Harding, Toledo, Ohio (approximately 1920)

Warren Harding spoke of "return to normalcy", playing upon the weariness of the American public after the social upheaval of the Progressive Era, World War I, and the Spanish flu. Additionally, the international responsibilities engendered by the Allied victory in World War I and the Treaty of Versailles proved deeply unpopular, causing a reaction against Wilson, who had pushed especially hard for the latter. Harding also delivered his speech "Americanism" during the campaign, a rebuke to the foreign policy of being too involved in Europe, he said "It is time to idealize, but it's very practical to make sure our own house is in perfect order before we attempt the miracle of Old World stabilization. Call it selfishness of nationality if you will, I think it an inspiration to patriotic devotion-- to safeguard America first, to stabilize America first, to prosper America first, to think of America first, to exalt America first, to live for and revere America first."

=== Ethnic issues ===
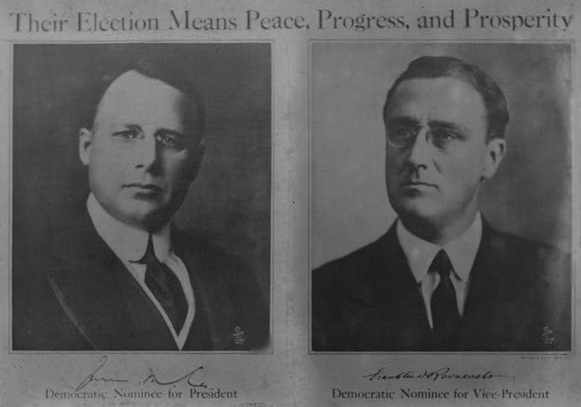
Poster for the 1920 Democratic presidential ticket

Irish Americans were powerful in the Democratic party, and groups such as Clan na Gael opposed going to war alongside their enemy Britain, especially after the violent suppression of the Easter Rising of 1916. Wilson won them over in 1917 by promising to ask Britain to give Ireland its independence. Wilson had won the presidential election of 1916 with strong support from German Americans and Irish Americans, largely because of his slogan "He kept us out of war" and the longstanding American policy of isolationism. At the Paris Peace Conference in 1919, however, he reneged on his commitments to the Irish-American community, who vehemently denounced him. His dilemma was that Britain was his war ally. Events such as the anti-British Black Tom and Kingsland explosions in 1916 on American soil (in part the result of wartime Irish and German co-ordination) and the Irish anti-conscription crisis of 1918 were all embarrassing to recall in 1920.

Britain had already passed an Irish Home Rule Act in 1914, suspended for the war's duration. However the 1916 Easter Rising in Dublin had led to increased support for the more radical Sinn Féin who in 1919 formed Dáil Éireann and made the Declaration of Independence, sparking the Irish War of Independence. Britain would pass the Government of Ireland Act 1920, by which Ireland would have two home-ruled states within the British empire. This satisfied Wilson. The provisions of these were inadequate to the supporters of the Irish Republic, however, which claimed full sovereignty. This position was also supported by many Irish Americans. The American Committee for Relief in Ireland was set up in 1920 to assist victims of the Irish War of Independence of 1919–21. Some Irish-American senators joined the "irreconcilables" who blocked the ratification of the Treaty of Versailles and United States membership in the League of Nations.

Wilson blamed the Irish Americans and German Americans for the lack of popular support for his unsuccessful campaign to have the United States join the League of Nations, saying, "There is an organized propaganda against the League of Nations and against the treaty proceeding from exactly the same sources that the organized propaganda proceeded from which threatened this country here and there with disloyalty, and I want to say—I cannot say too often—any man who carries a hyphen about with him [i.e., a hyphenated American] carries a dagger that he is ready to plunge into the vitals of this Republic whenever he gets ready."

Of the $5,500,000 raised by supporters of the Irish Republic in the United States in 1919–20, the Dublin parliament (Dáil Éireann) voted in June 1920 to spend $500,000 on the American presidential election. How this money was spent remains unclear. Ironically, the lawyer who had advised the fundraisers was Franklin D. Roosevelt, the losing vice-presidential candidate. In any case, the Irish American city machines sat on their hands during the election, allowing the Republicans to roll up unprecedented landslides in every major city. Many German-American Democrats voted Republican or stayed home, giving the GOP landslides in the rural Midwest.

=== Campaign ===
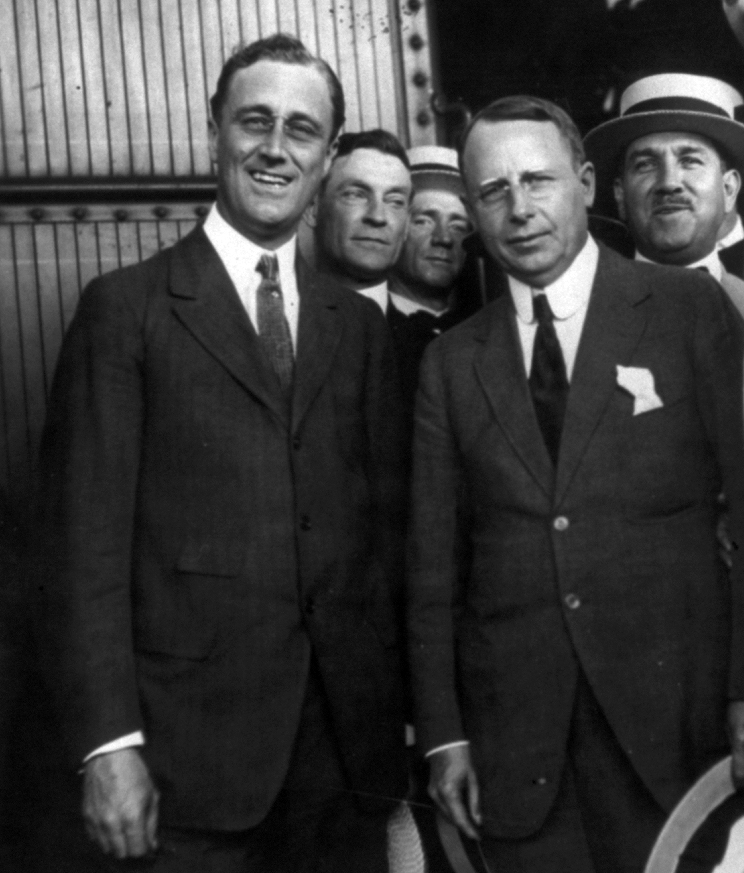
Roosevelt and Cox at a campaign appearance in Washington, D.C.

Wilson had hoped for a "solemn referendum" on the League of Nations, but did not get one. Harding waffled on the League, thereby keeping Idaho senator William Borah and other Republican "irreconcilables" in line. Cox also hedged. He went to the White House to seek Wilson's blessing and apparently endorsed the League, but—upon discovering its unpopularity among Democrats—revised his position to one that would accept the League only with reservations, particularly on Article Ten, which would require the United States to participate in any war declared by the League (thus taking the same standpoint as Republican Senate leader Henry Cabot Lodge). As reporter Brand Whitlock observed, the League was a much more important issue in government circles than to the electorate. He also noted that the campaign was not waged on issues: "The people, indeed, do not know what ideas Harding or Cox represents; neither do Harding or Cox. Great is democracy." False rumors circulated that Senator Harding had "Negro blood," but this did not greatly hurt Harding's election campaign.

Governor Cox made a whirlwind campaign that took him to rallies, train station speeches, and formal addresses, reaching audiences totaling perhaps two million, whereas Senator Harding relied upon a "Front Porch Campaign" like that of William McKinley in 1896. It brought thousands of voters to Marion, Ohio, where Harding spoke from his home. GOP campaign manager Will Hays spent some $8.1 million, nearly four times the money Cox's campaign spent. Hays used national advertising in a major way (with advice from adman Albert Lasker). The theme was Harding's own slogan "America First". Thus the Republican advertisement in Collier's for October 30, 1920, demanded, "Let's be done with wiggle and wobble." The image presented in the ads was nationalistic, using catch phrases like "absolute control of the United States by the United States," "Independence means independence, now as in 1776," "This country will remain American. Its next President will remain in our own country," and "We decided long ago that we objected to foreign government of our people."

Harding's landslide came from all directions except the South. Irish- and German-American voters who had backed Wilson and peace in 1916 now voted against Wilson and Versailles. "A vote for Harding", said the German-language press, "is a vote against the persecutions suffered by German-Americans during the war". No major German-language newspaper supported Governor Cox. Many Irish Americans, bitterly angry at Wilson's refusal to help Ireland at Versailles, simply abstained from voting in the presidential election. This allowed the Republicans to mobilize the ethnic vote, and Harding swept the big cities.

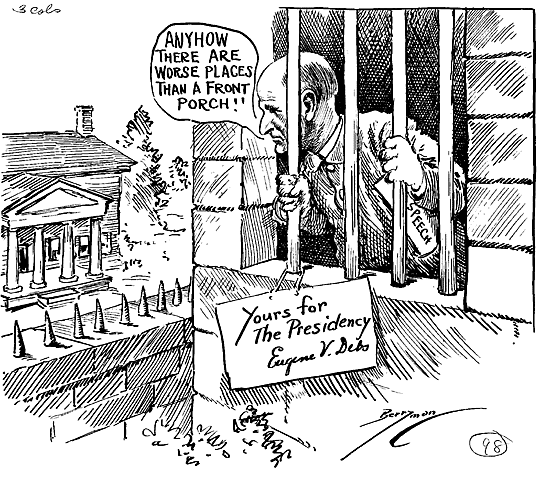
Clifford Berryman's cartoon depiction of Eugene V. Debs' campaign from prison.

This was the first election in which women from every state were allowed to vote, following the passage of the 19th Amendment to the Constitution in August 1920 (just in time for the general election).

Tennessee's vote for Warren G. Harding marked the first time since the end of Reconstruction that even one of the eleven states of the former Confederacy had voted for a Republican presidential candidate. The last Republican to claim Tennessee had been Ulysses S. Grant in 1868.

Despite the magnitude of Cox's defeat, his running mate Franklin D. Roosevelt became a well-known political figure because of his active and energetic campaign (despite suffering an illness in August 1921 that left him paralyzed from the waist down). In 1928, he was elected Governor of New York, and in 1932 he was elected president. He remained in power until his death in 1945 as the longest-serving American president in history.

== Results ==
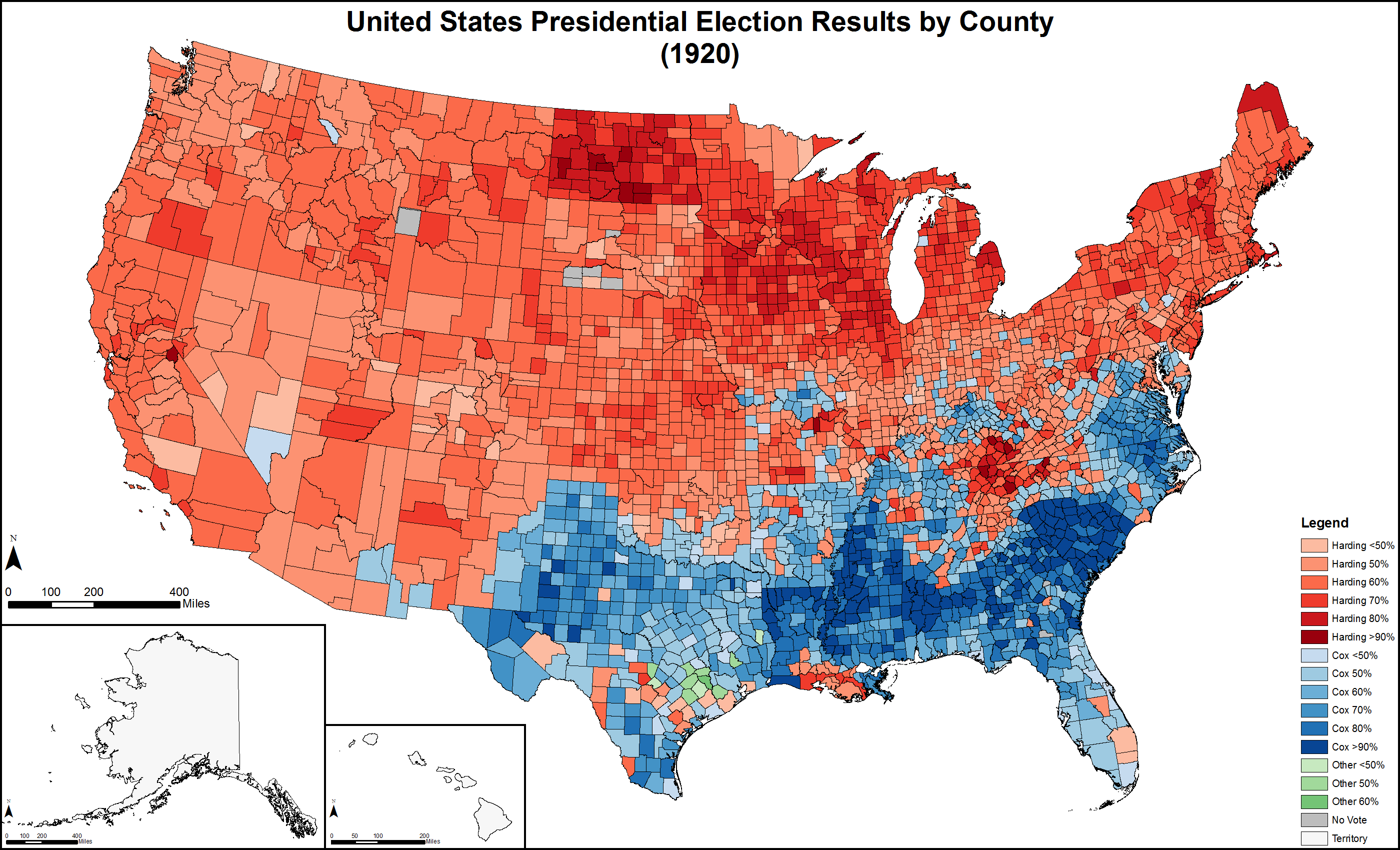
Results by county explicitly indicating the percentage for the winning candidate. Shades of red are for Harding (Republican), shades of blue are for Cox (Democratic), shades of green are for Ferguson (American), grey indicates zero recorded votes and white indicates territories not elevated to statehood.

The total vote for 1920 was roughly 26,750,000, an increase of eight million from 1916. Harding won in all twelve cities with populations above 500,000. Harding won a net vote total of 1,540,000 from the twelve largest cities, the most for any Republican and fifth highest for any candidate from 1920 to 1948. The Democratic vote was almost exactly the vote from 1916, but the Republican vote nearly doubled, as did the "other" vote. As noted earlier, the great increase in the total number of votes is mainly attributable to the passage of the Nineteenth Amendment to the United States Constitution, which gave women the right to vote. However, Georgia and Mississippi refused to let any women vote in this election, claiming that the amendment's August ratification had given women insufficient time to complete their voter registration.

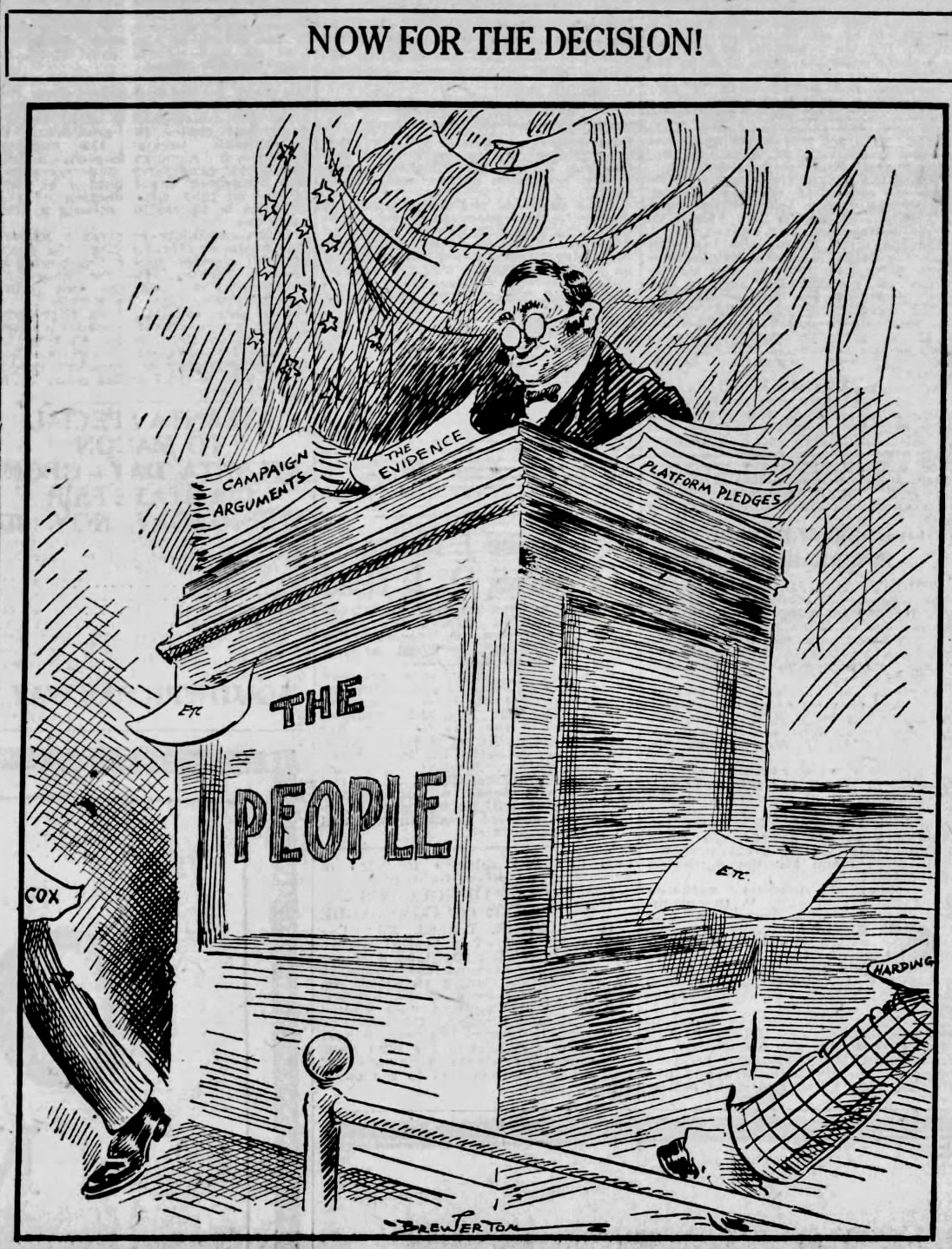
"Both Parties Claim Victory on Election Eve" The Atlanta Journal, November 1, 1920

The Republican ticket carried nearly two-thirds of the counties (1,949). Democrats carried only 1,101 counties, fewer than Alton Parker had carried in 1904 and consequently the fewest during the Fourth Party System until that point (Al Smith would carry even fewer in 1928). Harding carried every county in the Pacific section, where Wilson had carried 76 in 1916. In the Mountain section Cox carried only thirteen counties, seven of them in New Mexico bordering Texas, whereas Wilson carried all but twenty-one Mountain Section counties in 1916. At least one county was lost in every section in the Union and in every state except South Carolina and Mississippi. Eleven counties in Texas recorded a plurality for Ferguson. With the tipping point state of Rhode Island being decided by a 31.2 percent margin, the 1920 election has the largest margin of victory in the tipping point state in American history.

Wilson had won the support of Americans of German, Italian, Irish, or Jewish descent in the 1916 election, but Cox lost in all of those demographics and received less support from Jewish voters than Debs. Harding received support from over 90 percent of black voters.

The distribution of the county vote accurately represents the overwhelming character of the majority vote. Harding received 60.35 percent of the total vote, the largest percentage in the Fourth Party System, exceeding Franklin D. Roosevelt's in 1932. Although the Democratic share was 34.13 percent, in no section did its voting share sink below 24 percent, and in three sections, the Democrats topped the poll. The Democratic Party was still a significant opposition on national terms, even though Cox won only eleven states and had fewer votes in the Electoral College than Parker had won in 1904. More than two-thirds of the Cox vote was in states carried by Harding. The distribution of the vote by counties, and the study of percentages in sections, states, and counties, seem to show that it was Wilson and foreign policies that received the brunt of attack, not the Democratic Party and the domestic proposals of the period 1896–1914. This is one of three elections since the Civil War (along with those of 1924 and 1996) in which national voter turnout was below 50 percent.

This was also the third presidential election in which both major party candidates were registered in the same home state; the others have been in 1860, 1904, 1940, 1944, and 2016. The eleven states of the former Confederacy provided 5.83% of Harding's votes, with him taking 35.09% of the vote in that region.

Electoral results
Presidential candidate	Party	Home state	Popular vote		Electoral vote	Running mate		
Presidential candidate	Party	Home state	Count	Percentage	Electoral vote	Vice-presidential candidate	Home state	Electoral vote
Warren G. Harding	Republican	Ohio	16,166,126	60.35%	404	Calvin Coolidge	Massachusetts	404
James M. Cox	Democratic	Ohio	9,140,256	34.12%	127	Franklin D. Roosevelt	New York	127
Eugene V. Debs	Socialist	Indiana	914,191	3.41%	0	Seymour Stedman	Illinois	0
Parley P. Christensen	Farmer-Labor	Illinois	265,395	0.99%	0	Max S. Hayes	Ohio	0
Aaron S. Watkins	Prohibition	Indiana	188,709	0.70%	0	D. Leigh Colvin	New York	0
James E. Ferguson	American	Texas	47,968	0.18%	0	William J. Hough	New York	0
William Wesley Cox	Socialist Labor	Missouri	31,084	0.12%	0	August Gillhaus	New York	0
Robert Colvin Macauley	Single Tax	Pennsylvania	5,750	0.02%	0	Richard C. Barnum	Ohio	0
Other			28,746	0.11%	—	Other		—
Total			26,788,225	100%	531			531
Needed to win					266			266

Source (Popular Vote): Leip, David. "1920 Presidential Election Results". Dave Leip's Atlas of U.S. Presidential Elections.

Source (Electoral Vote): "Electoral College Box Scores 1789–1996". National Archives and Records Administration.

Popular vote
Harding	60.3%
Cox	34.1%
Debs	3.41%
Christensen	0.99%
Others	1.13%

Electoral vote
Harding	76.08%
Cox	23.92%

For the 1916 election, only a single radio station, 2XG, an experimental station operated by the De Forest Radio Telephone and Telegraph Company in New York City, made an audio broadcast of the election returns. For 1920, this increased to at least four stations, including the Detroit News' "Detroit News Radiophone" station, 8MK (later WWJ); a temporary arrangement made by the Saint Louis Post-Dispatch in conjunction with William E. Woods of the Benwoods Company, and the Buffalo Evening News, over an amateur station operated by Charles C. Klinck, Jr. However, the most prominent station was the debut of Westinghouse's ambitious commercial broadcast service, as announcers at 8ZZ (later KDKA) in East Pittsburgh read telegraph ticker results as they came in. Later station publicity proclaimed that this broadcast "was a national sensation, acclaimed by newspapers all over the country". However a comprehensive review of contemporary newspapers determined that reports, although positive, actually appeared only in a few local papers, thus it "was not an immediate 'sensation' and that the fame of this event developed over time with later celebratory accounts".

=== Geography of results ===
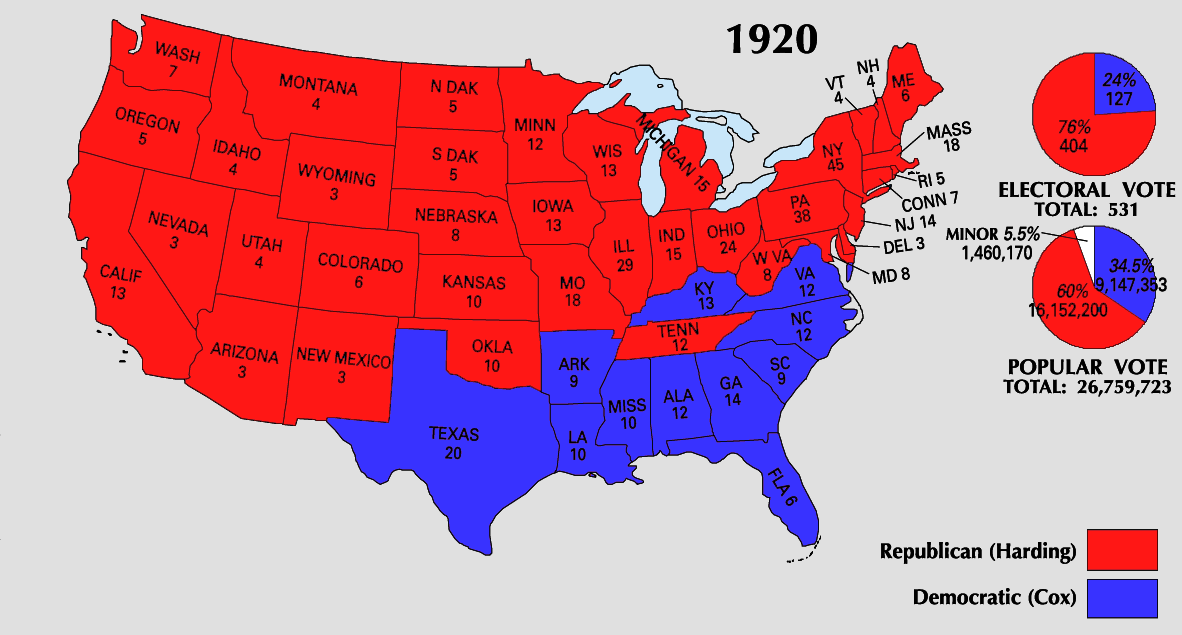

Results by county, shaded according to winning candidate's percentage of the vote

==== Cartographic gallery ====
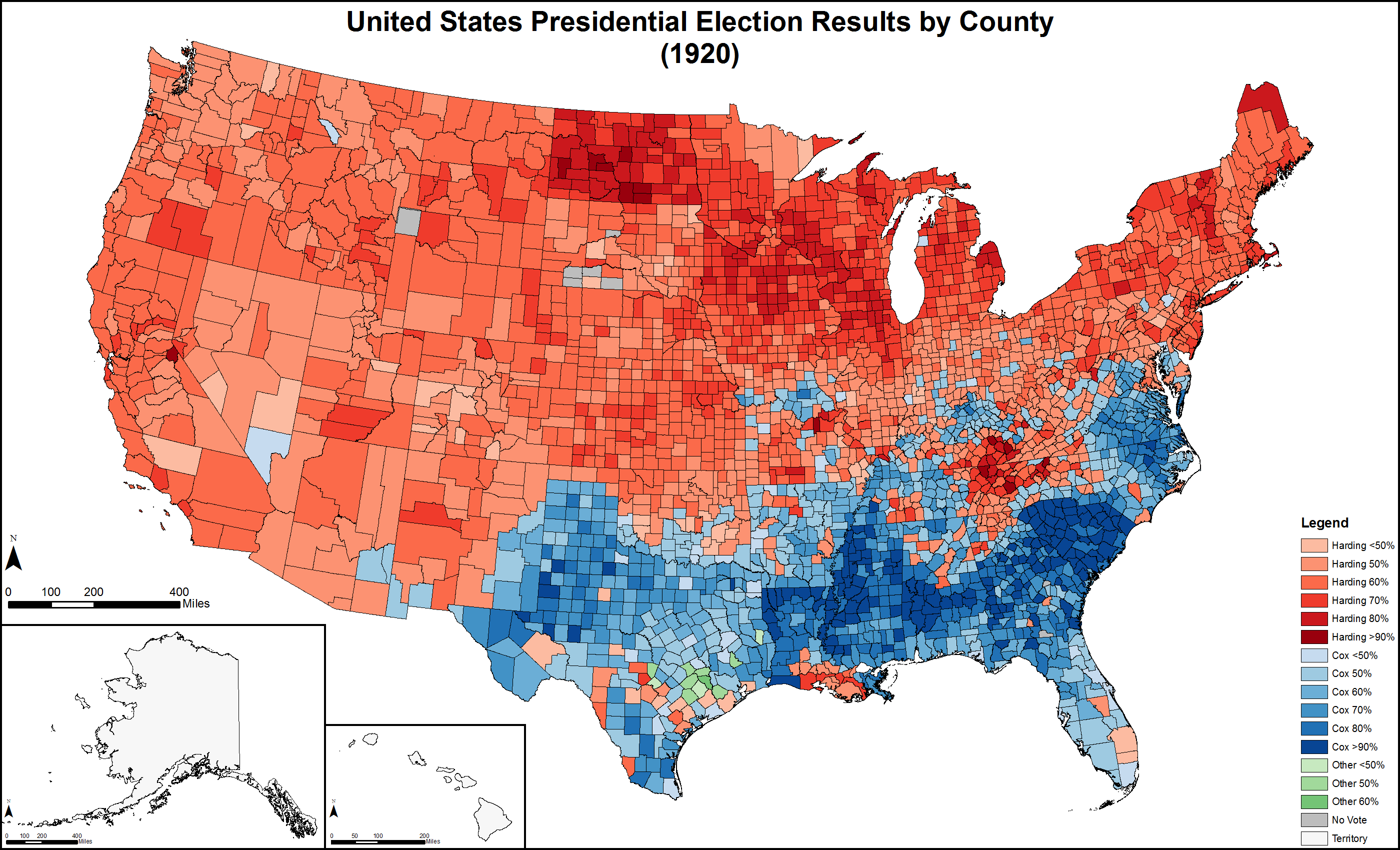
Map of presidential election results by county

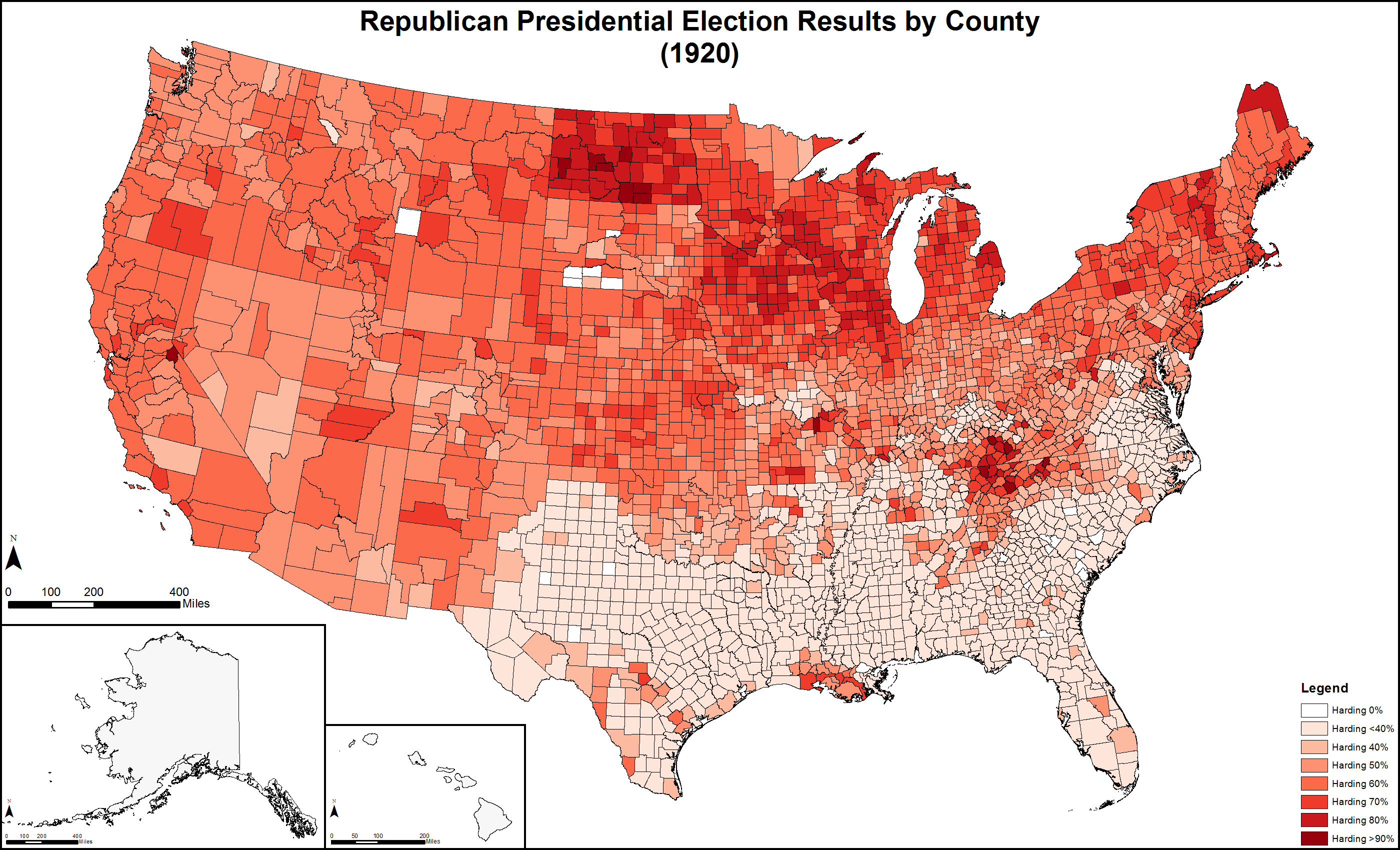
Map of Republican presidential election results by county

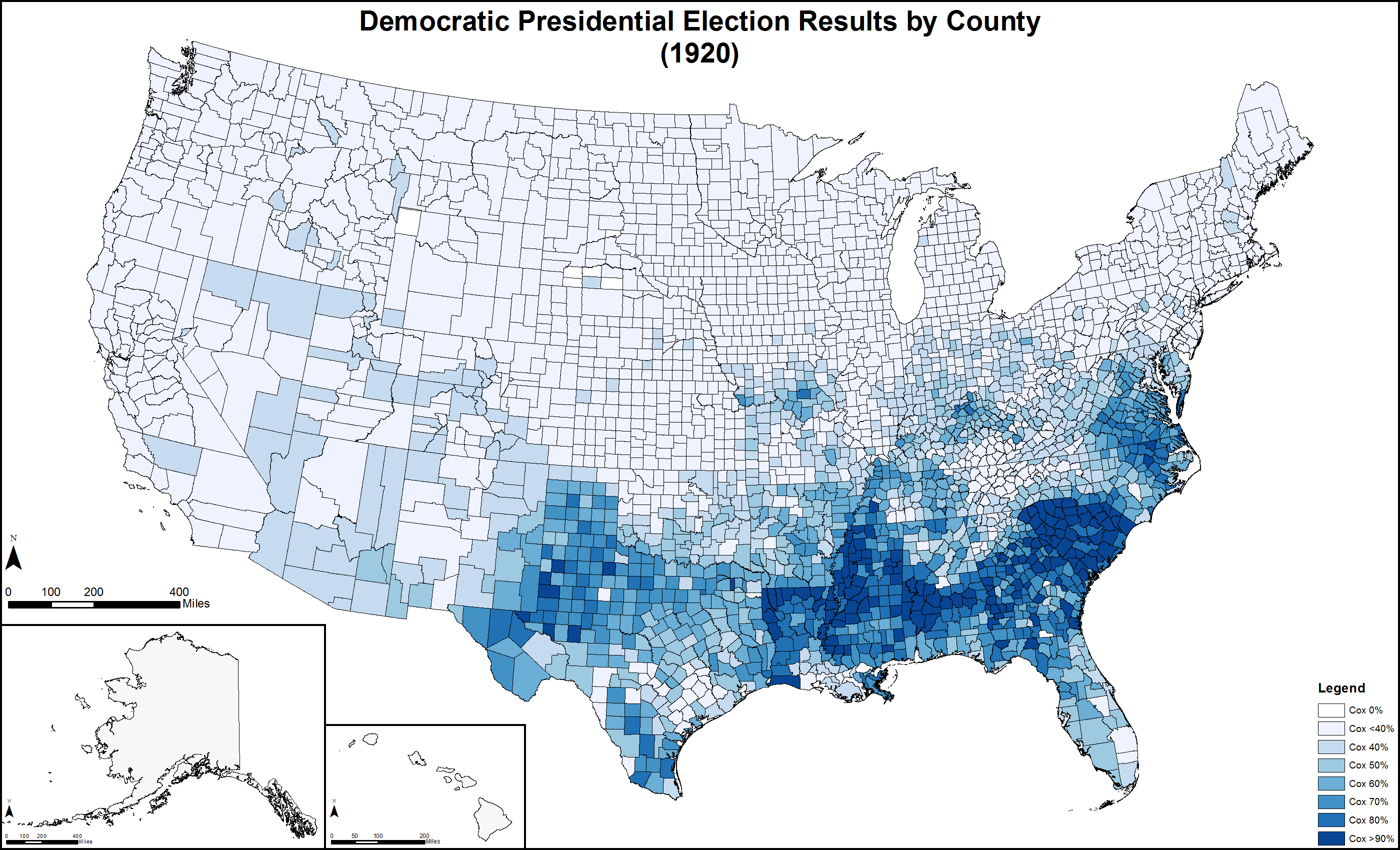
Map of Democratic presidential election results by county

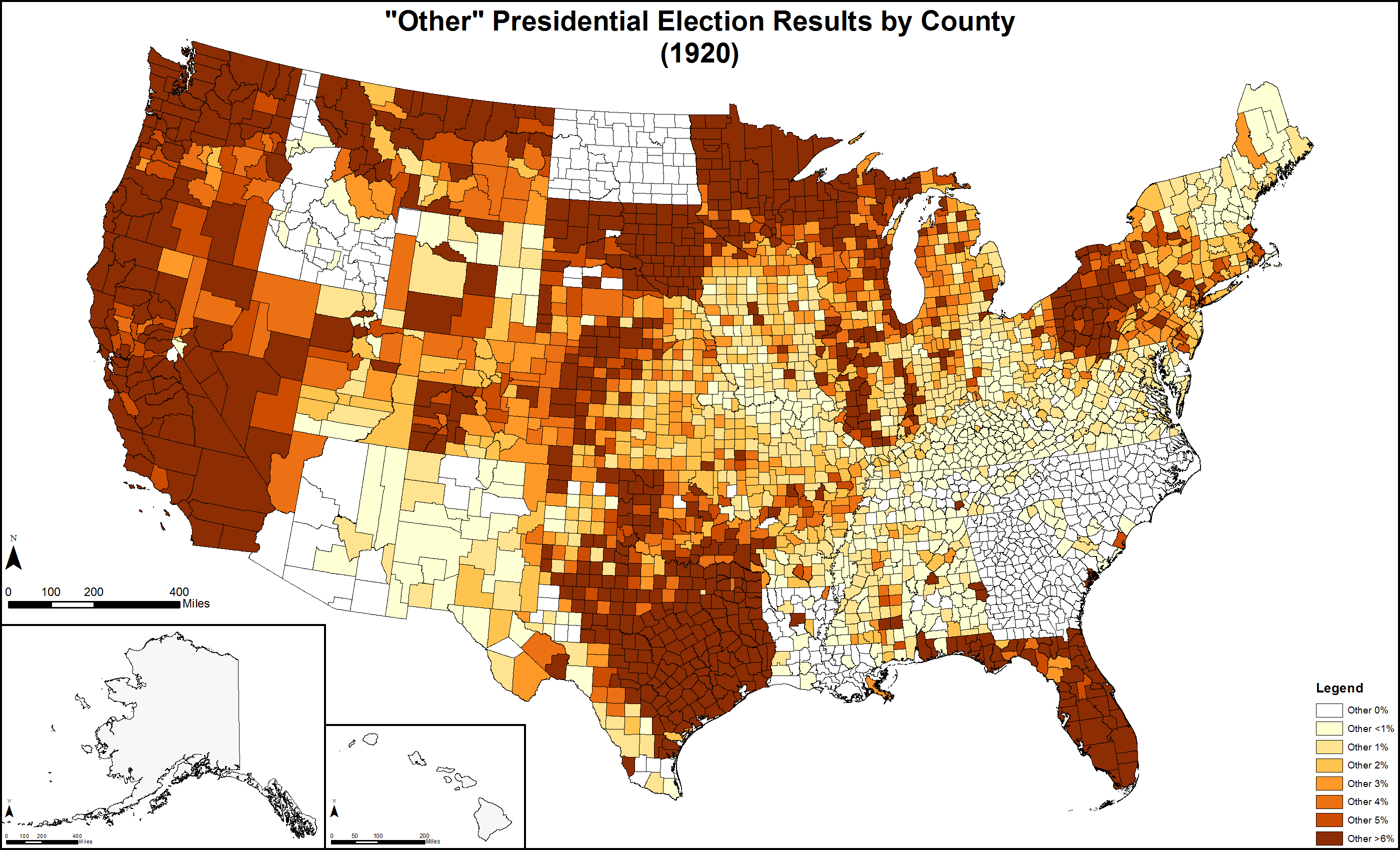
Map of "other" presidential election results by county

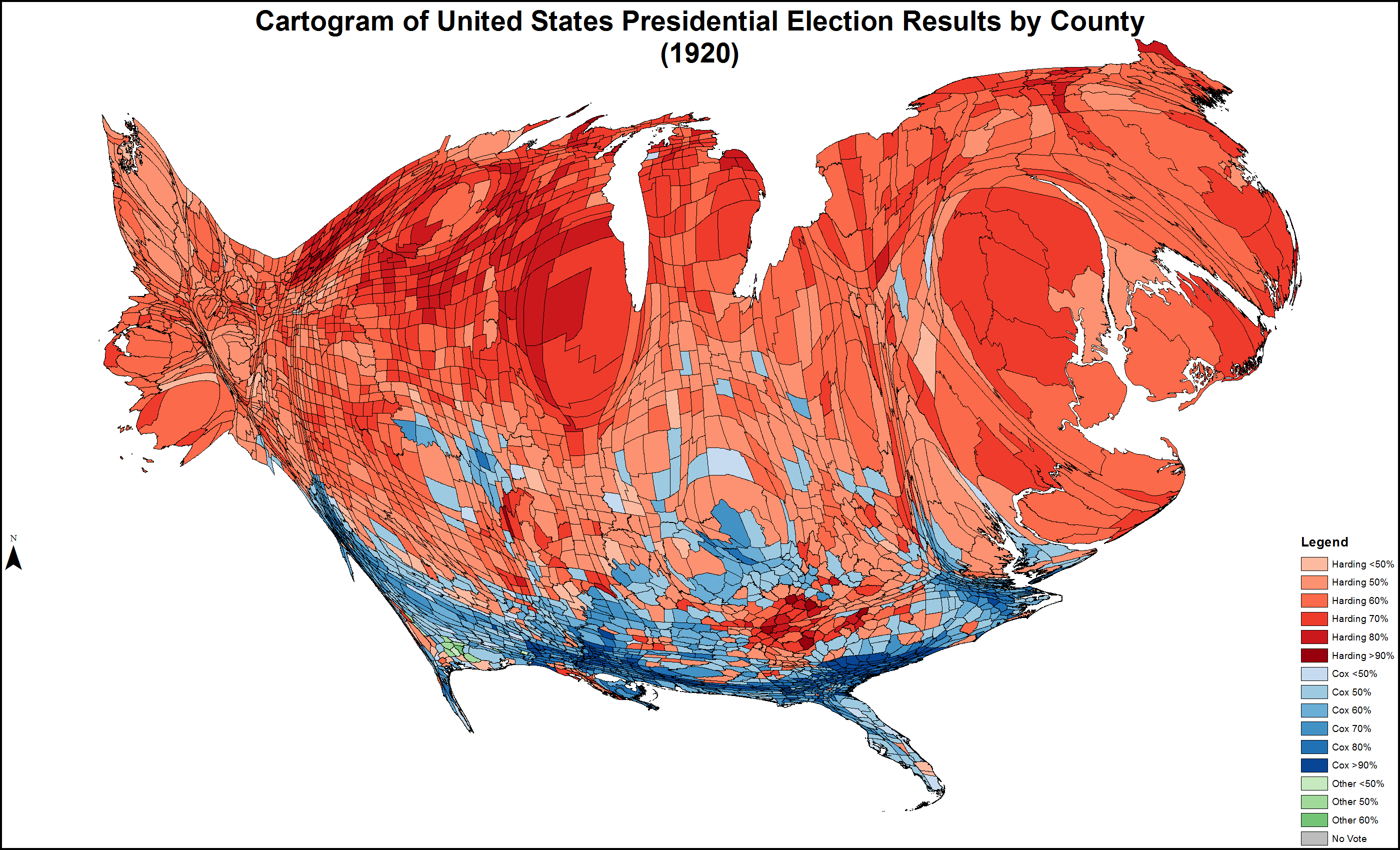
Cartogram of presidential election results by county

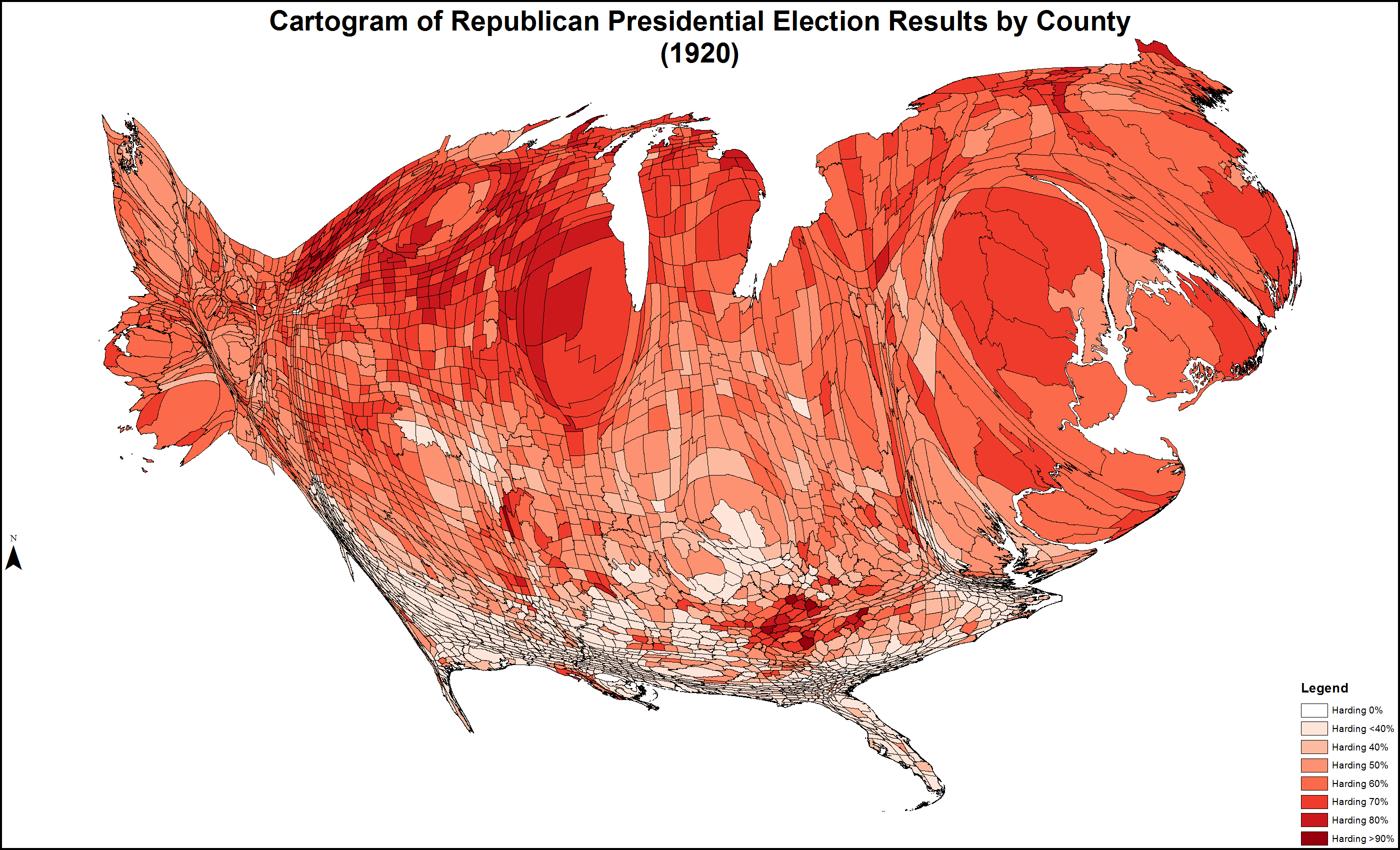
Cartogram of Republican presidential election results by county

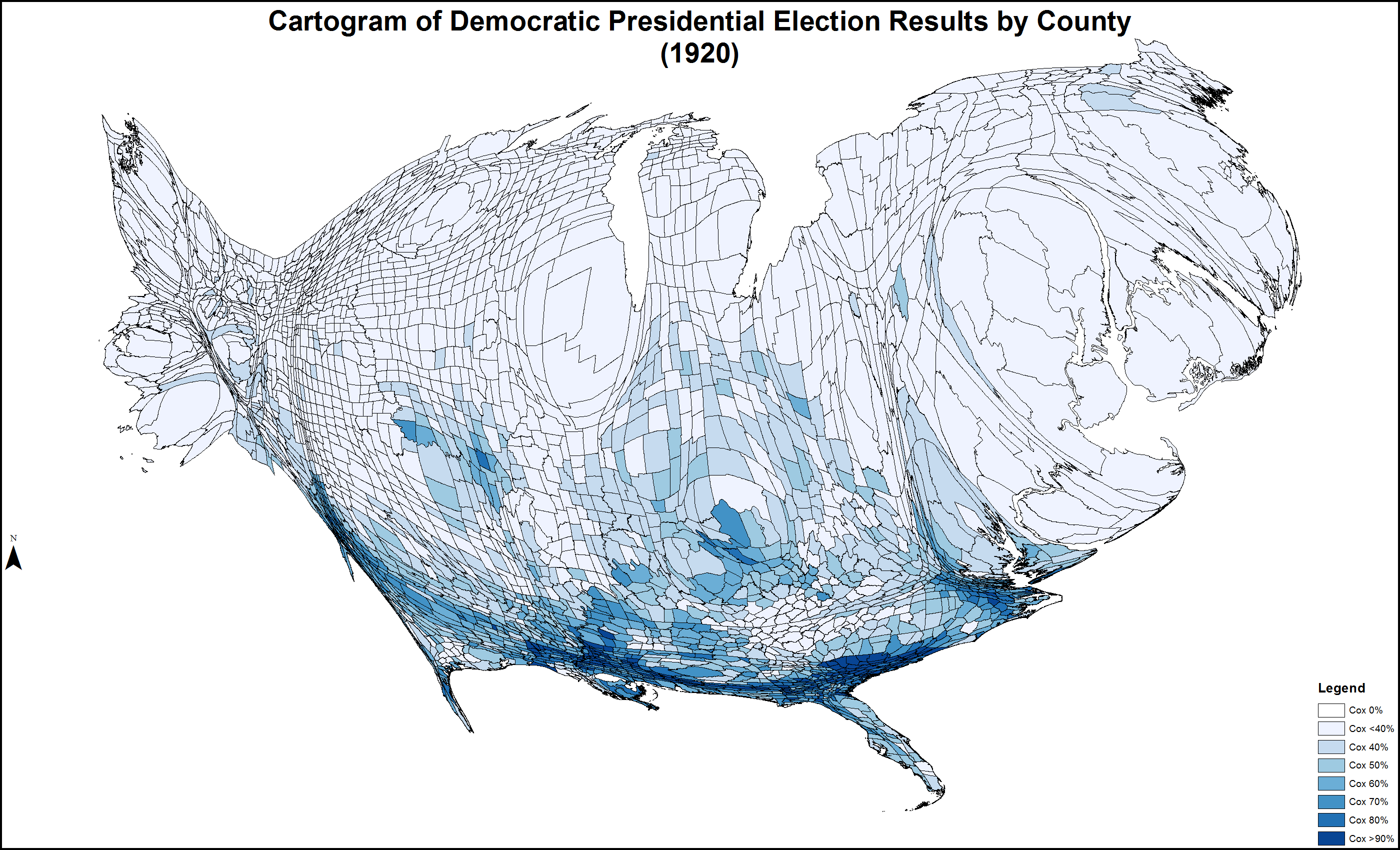
Cartogram of Democratic presidential election results by county

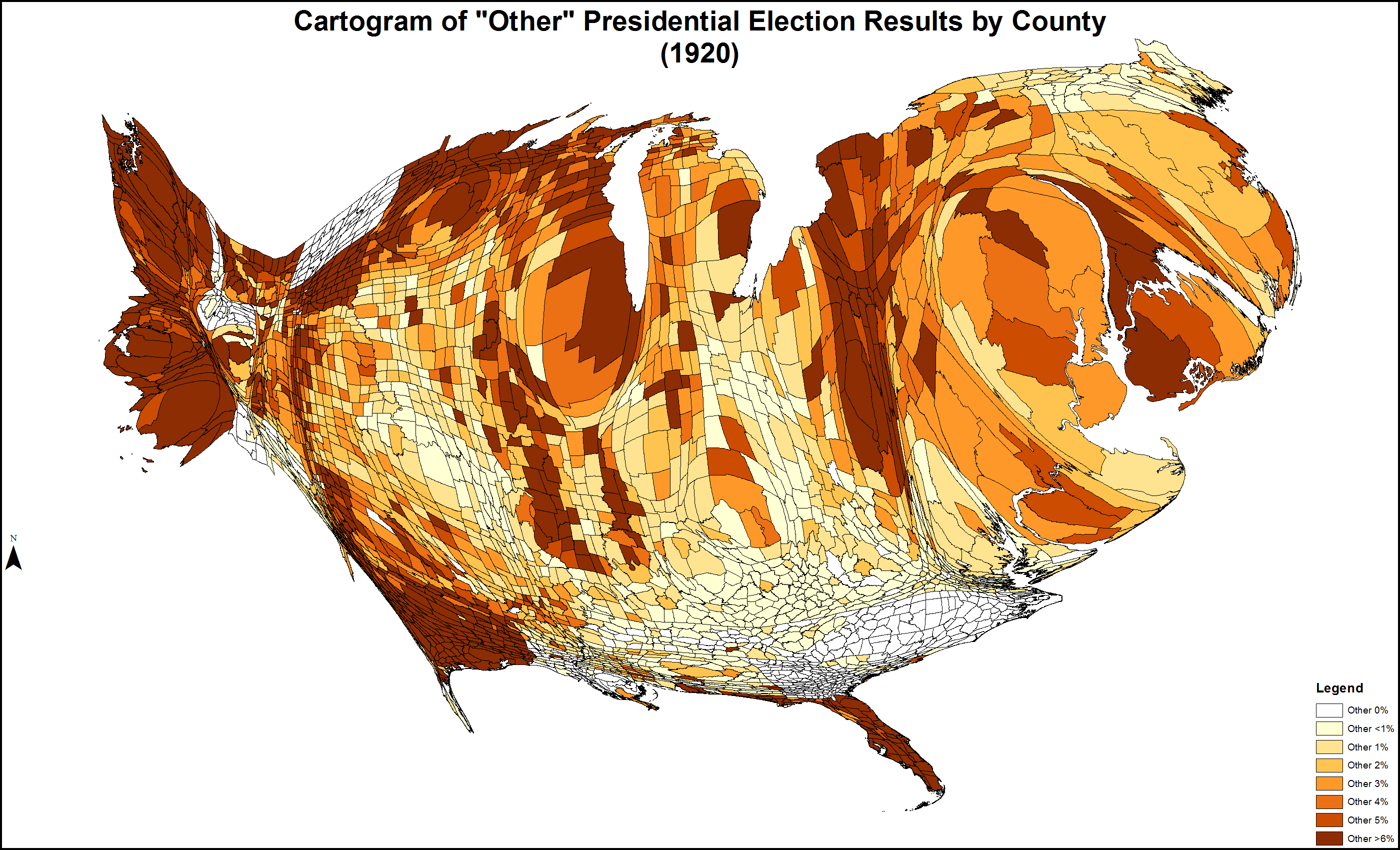
Cartogram of "other" presidential election results by county

State Level Performance for Eugene Debs' Presidential Campaign, 1920 (Socialist Party)

=== Results by state ===
States/districts won by Cox/Roosevelt
States/districts won by Harding/Coolidge

		Warren G. Harding Republican			James Cox Democratic			Eugene Debs Socialist			Parley Christensen Farmer-Labor			Aaron Watkins Prohibition			James Ferguson American			William Cox Socialist Labor			Margin		Margin Swing (Note: Percentage point difference in margin of Democratic and Republican candidates from the 1916 election)	State Total	
State	electoral votes	#	%	electoral votes	#	%	electoral votes	#	%	electoral votes	#	%	electoral votes	#	%	electoral votes	#	%	electoral votes	#	%	electoral votes	#	%	%	#	
Alabama	12	74,556	31.37	-	159,965	67.31	12	2,369	1.00	-	-	-	-	748	0.31	-	-	-	-	-	-	-	-85,409	-35.94	29.54	237,638	AL
Arizona	3	37,016	55.61	3	29,546	44.39	-	222	0.33	-	15	0.02	-	4	0.01	-	-	-	-	-	-	-	7,470	11.22	33.02	66,562	AZ
Arkansas	9	71,117	38.73	-	107,409	58.49	9	5,111	2.78	-	-	-	-	-	-	-	-	-	-	-	-	-	-36,292	-19.76	19.73	183,637	AR
California	13	624,992	66.20	13	229,191	24.28	-	64,076	6.79	-	-	-	-	25,204	2.67	-	-	-	-	-	-	-	395,801	41.93	42.31	944,050	CA
Colorado	6	173,248	59.32	6	104,936	35.93	-	8,046	2.75	-	3,016	1.03	-	2,807	0.96	-	-	-	-	-	-	-	68,312	23.39	53.38	292,053	CO
Connecticut	7	229,238	62.72	7	120,721	33.03	-	10,350	2.83	-	1,947	0.53	-	1,771	0.48	-	-	-	-	1,491	0.41	-	108,517	29.69	26.54	365,518	CT
Delaware	3	52,858	55.71	3	39,911	42.07	-	988	1.04	-	93	0.10	-	986	1.04	-	-	-	-	-	-	-	12,947	13.65	11.22	94,875	DE
Florida	6	44,853	30.79	-	90,515	62.13	6	5,189	3.56	-	-	-	-	5,124	3.52	-	-	-	-	-	-	-	-45,662	-31.34	19.90	145,681	FL
Georgia	14	41,089	27.72	-	107,162	72.28	14	465	0.31	-	-	-	-	-	-	-	-	-	-	-	-	-	-66,073	-44.57	28.05	148,251	GA
Idaho	4	88,975	65.60	4	46,579	34.34	-	38	0.03	-	-	-	-	32	0.02	-	-	-	-	-	-	-	42,396	31.26	42.17	135,624	ID
Illinois	29	1,420,480	67.81	29	534,395	25.51	-	74,747	3.57	-	49,630	2.37	-	11,216	0.54	-	-	-	-	3,471	0.17	-	886,085	42.30	33.06	2,094,714	IL
Indiana	15	696,370	55.14	15	511,364	40.49	-	24,703	1.96	-	16,499	1.31	-	13,462	1.07	-	-	-	-	-	-	-	185,006	14.65	13.68	1,262,964	IN
Iowa	13	634,674	70.91	13	227,921	25.46	-	16,981	1.90	-	10,321	1.15	-	4,197	0.47	-	-	-	-	982	0.11	-	406,753	45.44	34.10	895,082	IA
Kansas	10	369,268	64.75	10	185,464	32.52	-	15,511	2.72	-	-	-	-	-	-	-	-	-	-	-	-	-	183,804	32.23	38.09	570,318	KS
Kentucky	13	452,480	49.25	-	456,497	49.69	13	6,409	0.70	-	-	-	-	3,322	0.36	-	-	-	-	-	-	-	-4,017	-0.44	4.97	918,708	KY
Louisiana	10	38,538	30.49	-	87,519	69.24	10	-	-	-	-	-	-	-	-	-	-	-	-	-	-	-	-48,981	-38.75	40.28	126,396	LA
Maine	6	136,355	68.92	6	58,961	29.80	-	2,214	1.12	-	-	-	-	-	-	-	-	-	-	-	-	-	77,394	39.12	35.10	197,840	ME
Maryland	8	236,117	55.11	8	180,626	42.16	-	8,876	2.07	-	1,645	0.38	-	-	-	-	-	-	-	1,178	0.27	-	55,491	12.95	20.97	428,443	MD
Massachusetts	18	681,153	68.55	18	276,691	27.84	-	32,267	3.25	-	-	-	-	-	-	-	-	-	-	3,583	0.36	-	404,462	40.70	36.77	993,718	MA
Michigan	15	762,865	72.76	15	233,450	22.27	-	28,947	2.76	-	10,480	1.00	-	9,646	0.92	-	-	-	-	2,539	0.24	-	529,415	50.50	42.46	1,048,411	MI
Minnesota	12	519,421	70.59	12	142,994	19.43	-	56,106	7.62	-	-	-	-	11,489	1.56	-	-	-	-	5,828	0.79	-	376,427	51.16	51.06	735,838	MN
Mississippi	10	11,576	14.03	-	69,277	83.98	10	1,639	1.99	-	-	-	-	-	-	-	-	-	-	-	-	-	-57,701	-69.95	17.92	82,492	MS
Missouri	18	727,162	54.56	18	574,799	43.13	-	20,242	1.52	-	3,291	0.25	-	5,142	0.39	-	-	-	-	2,164	0.16	-	152,363	11.43	15.08	1,332,800	MO
Montana	4	109,430	61.13	4	57,372	32.05	-	-	-	-	12,204	6.82	-	-	-	-	-	-	-	-	-	-	52,058	29.08	48.37	179,006	MT
Nebraska	8	247,498	64.66	8	119,608	31.25	-	9,600	2.51	-	-	-	-	5,947	1.55	-	-	-	-	-	-	-	127,890	33.41	47.70	382,743	NE
Nevada	3	15,479	56.92	3	9,851	36.22	-	1,864	6.85	-	-	-	-	-	-	-	-	-	-	-	-	-	5,628	20.70	37.66	27,194	NV
New Hampshire	4	95,196	59.84	4	62,662	39.39	-	1,234	0.78	-	-	-	-	-	-	-	-	-	-	-	-	-	32,534	20.45	20.51	159,092	NH
New Jersey	14	611,541	67.65	14	256,887	28.42	-	27,141	3.00	-	2,200	0.24	-	4,734	0.52	-	-	-	-	923	0.10	-	354,654	39.23	27.51	903,943	NJ
New Mexico	3	57,634	54.68	3	46,668	44.27	-	-	-	-	1,104	1.05	-	-	-	-	-	-	-	-	-	-	10,966	10.40	14.18	105,406	NM
New York	45	1,871,167	64.56	45	781,238	26.95	-	203,201	7.01	-	18,413	0.64	-	19,653	0.68	-	-	-	-	4,841	0.17	-	1,089,929	37.60	30.58	2,898,513	NY
North Carolina	12	232,848	43.22	-	305,447	56.70	12	446	0.08	-	-	-	-	-	-	-	-	-	-	-	-	-	-72,599	-13.48	2.92	538,741	NC
North Dakota	5	160,072	77.79	5	37,422	18.19	-	8,282	4.02	-	-	-	-	-	-	-	-	-	-	-	-	-	122,650	59.60	61.10	205,776	ND
Ohio	24	1,182,022	58.47	24	780,037	38.58	-	57,147	2.83	-	-	-	-	-	-	-	-	-	-	-	-	-	401,985	19.88	27.55	2,021,653	OH
Oklahoma	10	243,831	50.11	10	217,053	44.61	-	25,726	5.29	-	-	-	-	-	-	-	-	-	-	-	-	-	26,778	5.50	22.90	486,610	OK
Oregon	5	143,592	60.20	5	80,019	33.55	-	9,801	4.11	-	-	-	-	3,595	1.51	-	-	-	-	1,515	0.64	-	63,573	26.65	24.08	238,522	OR
Pennsylvania	38	1,218,216	65.76	38	503,843	27.20	-	70,571	3.81	-	15,704	0.85	-	42,696	2.30	-	-	-	-	753	0.04	-	714,373	38.56	24.52	1,852,616	PA
Rhode Island	5	107,463	63.97	5	55,062	32.78	-	4,351	2.59	-	-	-	-	510	0.30	-	-	-	-	495	0.29	-	52,401	31.19	26.11	167,981	RI
South Carolina	9	2,610	3.91	-	64,170	96.05	9	28	0.04	-	-	-	-	-	-	-	-	-	-	-	-	-	-61,560	-92.14	2.15	66,808	SC
South Dakota	5	110,692	60.74	5	35,938	19.72	-	-	-	-	34,707	19.04	-	900	0.49	-	-	-	-	-	-	-	74,754	41.02	37.12	182,237	SD
Tennessee	12	219,829	51.29	12	206,558	48.19	-	2,239	0.52	-	-	-	-	-	-	-	-	-	-	-	-	-	13,271	3.10	16.71	428,626	TN
Texas	20	114,538	23.54	-	288,767	59.34	20	8,121	1.67	-	-	-	-	-	-	-	47,968	9.86	-	-	-	-	-174,229	-35.80	23.67	486,641	TX
Utah	4	81,555	55.93	4	56,639	38.84	-	3,159	2.17	-	4,475	3.07	-	-	-	-	-	-	-	-	-	-	24,916	17.09	38.05	145,828	UT
Vermont	4	68,212	75.82	4	20,919	23.25	-	-	-	-	-	-	-	774	0.86	-	-	-	-	-	-	-	47,293	52.57	25.36	89,961	VT
Virginia	12	87,456	37.85	-	141,670	61.32	12	807	0.35	-	243	0.11	-	857	0.37	-	-	-	-	-	-	-	-54,214	-23.47	11.25	231,033	VA
Washington	7	223,137	55.96	7	84,298	21.14	-	8,913	2.24	-	77,246	19.37	-	3,800	0.95	-	-	-	-	1,321	0.33	-	138,839	34.82	39.06	398,715	WA
West Virginia	8	282,007	55.30	8	220,789	43.30	-	5,618	1.10	-	-	-	-	1,528	0.30	-	-	-	-	-	-	-	61,218	12.00	11.07	509,942	WV
Wisconsin	13	498,576	71.10	13	113,422	16.17	-	80,635	11.50	-	-	-	-	8,647	1.23	-	-	-	-	-	-	-	385,154	54.92	48.63	701,280	WI
Wyoming	3	35,091	64.15	3	17,429	31.86	-	-	-	-	2,180	3.99	-	-	-	-	-	-	-	-	-	-	17,662	32.29	45.16	54,700	WY
TOTALS:	531	16,144,093	60.32	404	9,139,661	34.15	127	913,693	3.41	-	265,398	0.99	-	188,787	0.71	-	47,968	0.18	-	31,084	0.12	-	7,004,432	26.17	29.29	26,765,180	US

==== States that flipped from Democratic to Republican ====
- Arizona
- California
- Colorado
- Idaho
- Kansas
- Maryland
- Missouri
- Montana
- Nebraska
- Nevada
- New Hampshire
- New Mexico
- North Dakota
- Ohio
- Oklahoma
- Tennessee
- Utah
- Washington
- Wyoming

==== Close states ====
Margin of victory less than 1% (13 electoral votes):

1. Kentucky, 0.44% (4,017 votes)

Margin of victory less than 5% (12 electoral votes):

1. Tennessee, 3.10% (13,271 votes)

Margin of victory between 5% and 10% (10 electoral votes):

1. Oklahoma, 5.50% (26,778 votes)

Tipping point state:

1. Rhode Island, 31.19% (52,401 votes)

==== Statistics ====
Counties with Highest Percentage of the Vote (Republican)

1. McIntosh County, North Dakota 95.76%
2. Leslie County, Kentucky 94.22%
3. Sevier County, Tennessee 93.60%
4. Sheridan County, North Dakota 92.98%
5. Billings County, North Dakota 92.81%

Counties with Highest Percentage of the Vote (Democratic)

1. Chester County, South Carolina 100.00%
2. Edgefield County, South Carolina 100.00%
3. Clarendon County, South Carolina 100.00%
4. Bamberg County, South Carolina 100.00%
5. Hampton County, South Carolina 100.00%

Counties with Highest Percentage of the Vote (American)

1. Austin County, Texas 61.72%
2. Fort Bend County, Texas 59.35%
3. Lavaca County, Texas 57.76%
4. Fayette County, Texas 55.12%
5. Washington County, Texas 54.04%

== See also ==
- History of the United States (1918–1945)
- History of the United States Democratic Party
- History of the United States Republican Party
- Inauguration of Warren G. Harding
- 1920 United States House of Representatives elections
- 1920 United States Senate elections

== Works cited ==
- Sherman, Richard (1973). The Republican Party and Black America From McKinley to Hoover 1896-1933. University of Virginia Press. ISBN 0813904676.
