= Havana, Ohio =

Coordinates: 41°08′14″N 82°44′50″W

Havana is an unincorporated community in Huron County, Ohio, United States.

== History ==
Havana had its start in 1848 when the Sandusky & Mansfield Railroad was extended to that point. A post office was established at Havana in 1851, and remained in operation until 1959. The community most likely was named after Havana, the capital of Cuba.
