= Goodmans (electronics company) =

British consumer electronics brand

- Current owner: B&M Group
- Country: United Kingdom
- Introduced: c. 1925
- Previous owners: Alba / Harvard International (until 2022)
- Website: www.goodmansuk.com

Goodmans is a British consumer electronics brand, currently under the ownership of the B&M Group. It originated as a company named Goodmans Industries in Wembley and later based in Hampshire, best known for loudspeakers. A wide range of products have been marketed under the name, traditionally focused in audio, stand-alone speakers and radios, but now expanded to various other electronics.

== Company and brand history ==
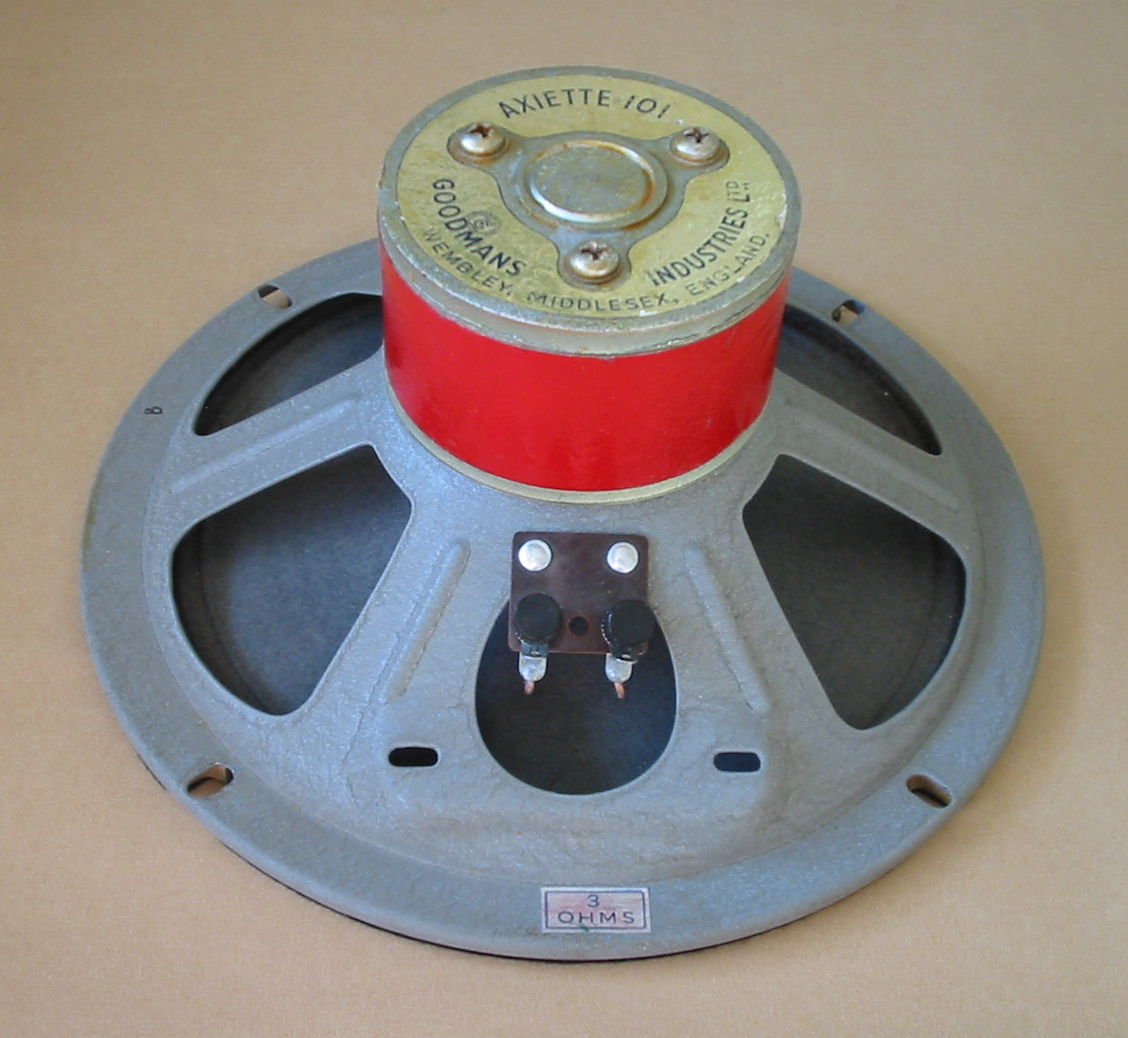
Goodmans produced some famous loudspeakers and drivers such as Axiette fullrange driver.

Goodmans Industries was founded in 1923, 1925, or 1926, in Wembley, Middlesex. The company started as a manufacturer of loudspeakers for public address systems. As of the post-war period through to the 1960s, it was based in Lancelot Road, Wembley, where production and engineering took place.

The company was sold in 1959 to Joseph Robinson's Relay Exchanges, which later became known as Rentaset. In 1964, Rentaset merged with Radio Rentals and became known as Radio Rentaset.

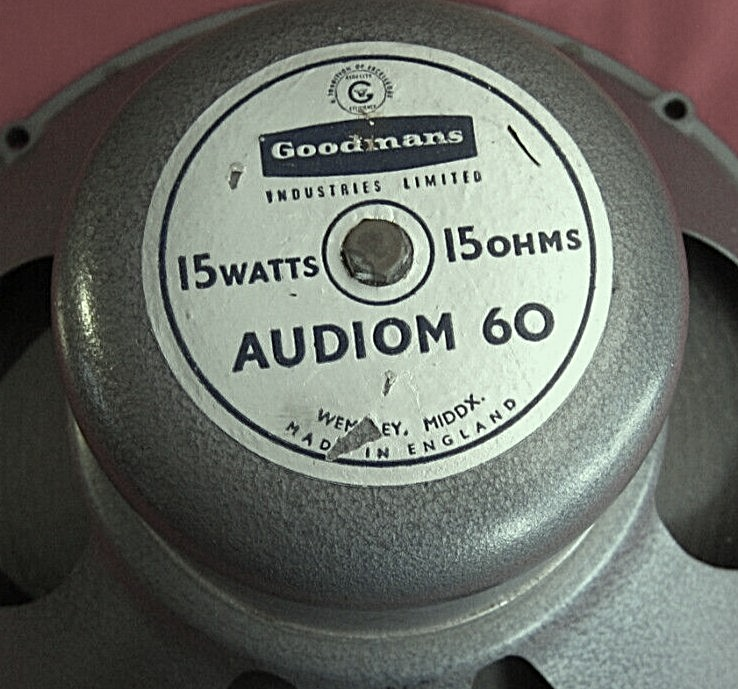
Close-up view of Goodmans's Audiom 60 speaker

In 1967, Goodmans was merged with the acoustic division of Plessey Components Group, based in Havant, Hampshire, and became a subsidiary of a new company, Goodmans Loudspeakers Ltd. In 1968, the company was acquired by Thorn Electrical Industries (later Thorn EMI) as part of their merger with Radio Rentals.

Goodmans moved to Downley Road, Havant in 1970.

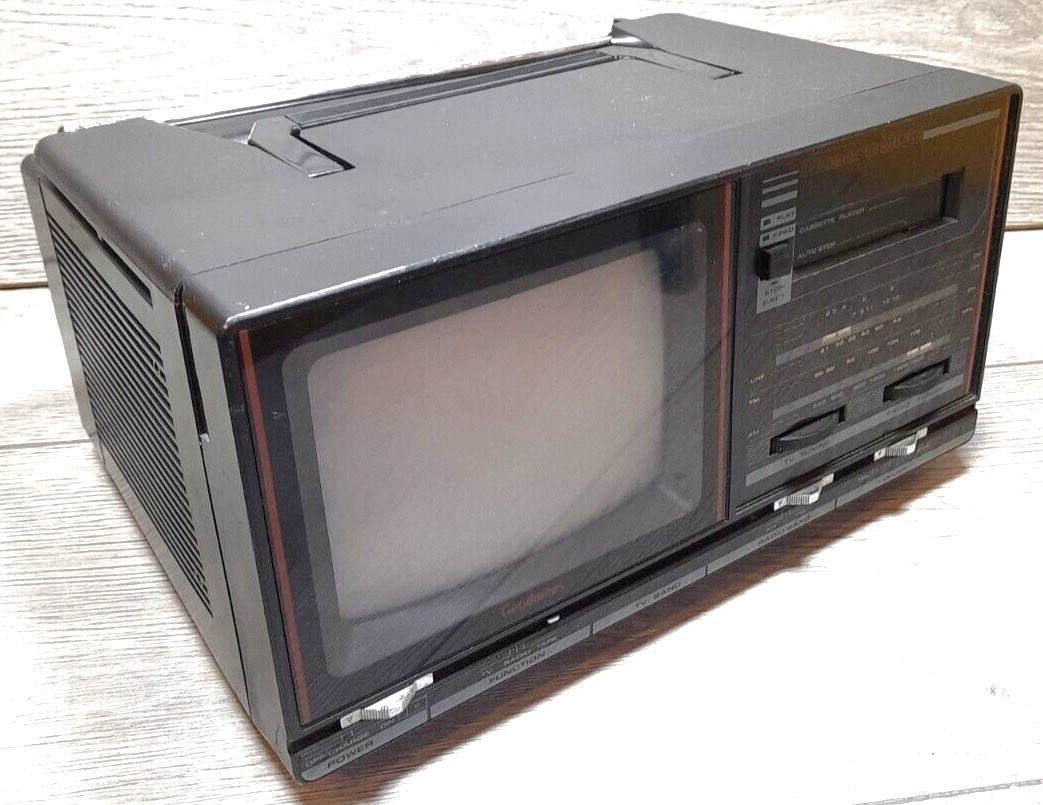
Goodmans Quadro 900, portable TV and radio

In 1984 there was a management buyout at Goodmans Loudspeakers. Its turnover had risen from £7 million to £20 million within three years' time. That same year, in 1987, the company purchased fellow loudspeaker maker Mordaunt-Short, then in September of that year announced a merger with Tannoy, resulting in the largest audio equipment company of Britain. Goodmans Loudspeakers became a subsidiary of the newly created Tannoy Goodmans Industries (TGI). Along with these three brands, the TGI group also owned the Epos and Creek Audio brands. The company later moved to Ridgeway in Havant. TGI floated on the stock exchange, becoming the first company to do so following the Black Monday crash.

Former logo

Goodmans was the shirt sponsor of the English football team Portsmouth F.C. from 1989 to 1995.

Goodmans effectively split in 1991, with OEM loudspeaker builder Goodmans Loudspeakers Limited (GLL) set up as a separate company. On the other hand, the part of Goodmans marketing foreign-made products like in-car entertainment and television sets was purchased by Alba in May 1994 for a "maximum of £3.6 million" and became a subsidiary, Goodmans Industries Limited. The Alba Group also owned and marketed Alba, Bush and Hinari branded electronics. The Alba Group became Harvard International in 2008 when their Alba and Bush brands were purchased by the Home Retail Group.

The Goodmans brand was sold by Harvard International to the B&M Group in 2022, which had been a long time licensee selling Goodmans products in its B&M retail stores.

== Product range ==
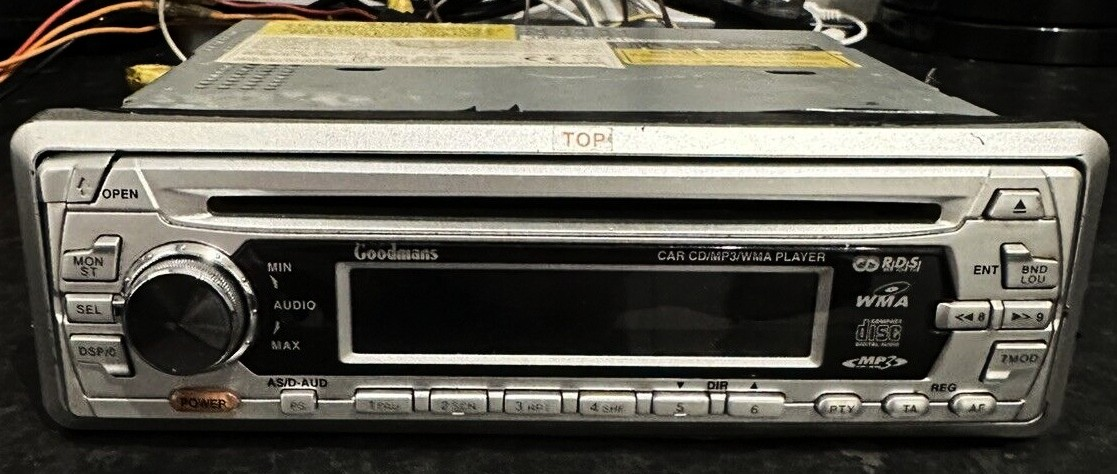
Goodmans car stereo from the 2000s

In the 1960s, Goodmans Industries extended their products to amplifiers with the introduction of the Maxamp30, the first British made solid state amplifier. Also at the time, Goodmans marketed a loudspeaker named Maxim, which was described as "unusually small" in a BBC research department's document.

Throughout the 1970s and 1980s, Goodmans continued to develop loudspeakers, amplifiers, tuners and receivers. At one point it was a major supplier for loudspeakers to the hi-fi market and to the motor car industry. For instance, it made the first speakers supplied for the Ford Granada, Sierra and Fiesta car models.

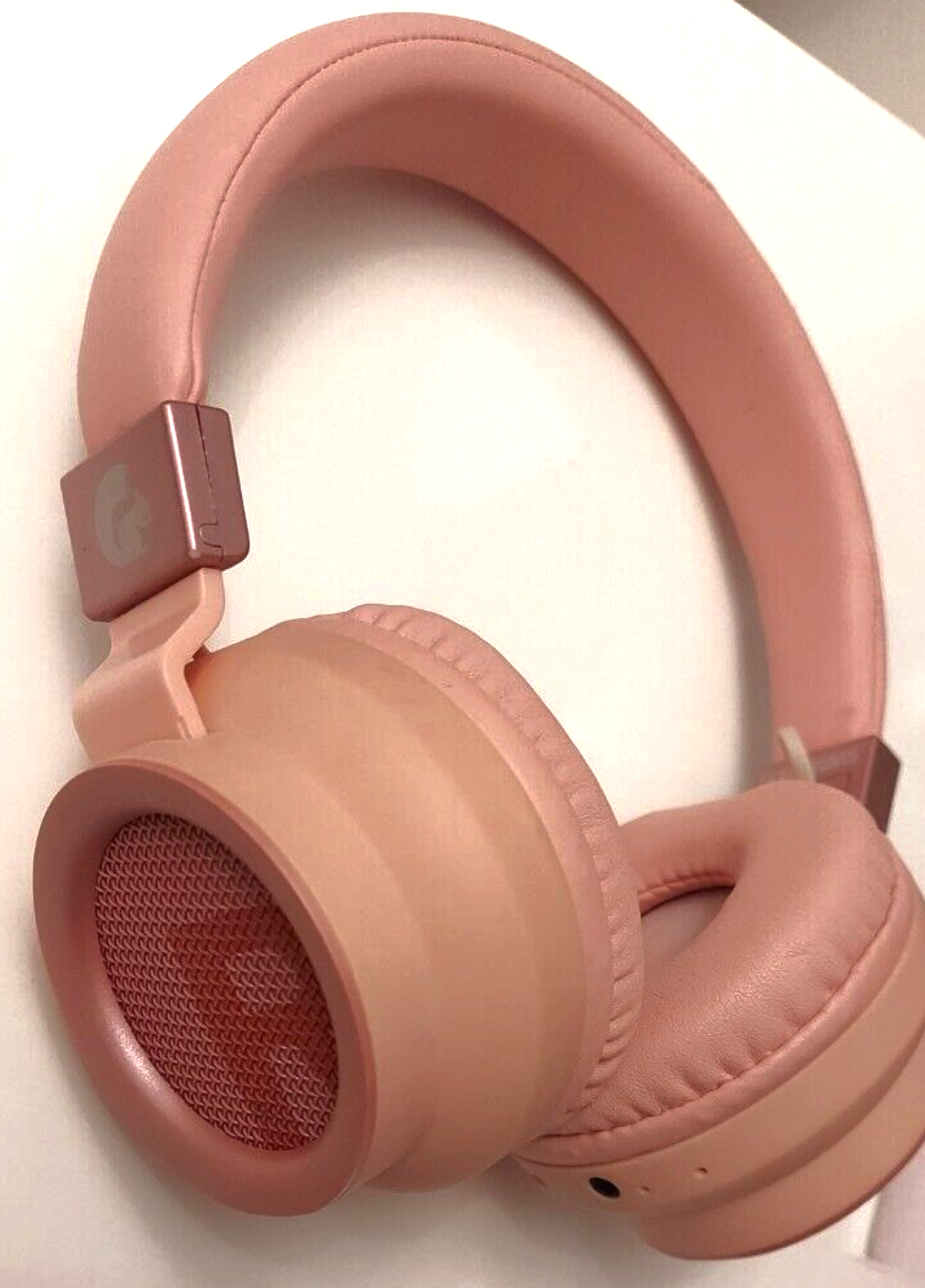
Pink Goodmans headphones from the 2020s

Goodmans launched their first DAB digital radio products in October 2002, including the GPS280 portable stereo CD player. By the new century, Goodmans products had shifted in large part away from audio to set-top boxes during the rise of digital TV. They launched their first HD ready TV on 27 July 2007.

To breathe new life into the brand, Goodmans began to return to its audio roots in 2013. It collaborated with a design consultancy, Rodd Design, and led to the release of the 50s-style Goodmans Heritage radio and various other products. The next year Goodmans rebranded with a fresh new logo featuring a squirrel. It also launched the Canvas, Go and Pebble portable radios, then in 2015 the Aspect soundbar and the 60s-style Oxford digital radio which is a recreation of a Bush TR130.
