= Schreiber Furniture =

Former British furniture manufacturer

- Type: Limited company
- Industry: Manufacturer
- Founded: 1957
- Founder: Chaim Schreiber
- Defunct: 2017
- Headquarters: Milton Keynes, England
- Area served: United Kingdom
- Products: Kitchens, furniture
- Owner: J Sainsbury plc
- Website: www.argos.co.uk/schreiber

Schreiber was a brand of fitted kitchen and furniture operating in the United Kingdom.

Started in 1957 by Chaim Schreiber to make furniture, Schreiber became an extremely successful brand in furniture from the 1960s to the early 1970s, challenging both Harris Lebus and Gomme for domination. In the 1970s it became vertically integrated by opening its own furniture centres. The company merged with GEC in the 1970s. Schreiber was later bought out by the MFI, and on MFI's bankruptcy in 2008, the brand rights were bought by the Home Retail Group in 2009. In 2016, the Home Retail Group was purchased by the UK retailer Sainsbury's, who quietly dropped the Schreiber brand the following year in 2017.

== History ==
=== Early years ===
In 1957, Chaim Schreiber, a Polish refugee immigrant who made radio cabinets for Dansette and other larger electrical manufacturers, bought the bankrupt furniture business Lubetkin and re-branded it under his own name, Schreiber.

=== Expansion ===
Schreiber was hugely successful in the 1960s and 1970s, challenging Lebus and Gomme for domination. It was a major manufacturer of bedroom furniture in the 1960s at the value end of the market. It bought the more upmarket competitor Greaves and Thomas in 1967.

=== Vertical integration ===
In 1970, Schreiber's turnover overtook that of arch-rival Gomme, helped by the failure of its even bigger competitor Harris Lebus the previous year.

Schreiber introduced both new upholstered furniture and bedroom furniture in 1973. It also started selling fitted kitchens, ensuring that it offered something for the whole house. Schreiber also opened Schreiber Furniture Centres, which were 3,500 sq ft in size stocking 4,000 products. It invited retail traders to bid for their shops to become its new centres, and 280 opened out of 800 applications.

=== Merger with GEC ===
In 1973 turnover was double that of 1971, but trade started to suffer thereafter. Chaim Schreiber tried and aborted flotation attempts on the stock market of the company in 1972 and 1973, and by 1974 the company was in need of cash. A merger was proposed by Sir Arnold Weinstock of GEC between Schreiber Wood Industries and British Domestic Appliances (BDA), better known as the company behind Hotpoint and Morphy Richards. GEC placed BDA in a new subsidiary company called GEC-Schreiber Limited and Schreiber also came under the ownership of that company. GEC held 62.5% of the resulting business, with Chaim Schreiber holding 27.5%. This merger took place in August 1974, and by the end of that financial year, the combined group returned a small profit. It was noted that in 1974 Schreiber were the largest producer of domestic furniture in the UK.

In 1978 the company completed a new factory in Runcorn, Cheshire. The empty shell had been completed in 1974 to designs of Peter Carmichael of Runcorn Development Corporation Architects Department, and the finished factory was completed by him as partner in the architectural firm; Brock Carmichael Associates. (The factory is now a supply depot for Howdens Joinery). In April 1982, the company sold Morphy Richards for £5 million to a holding company owned by The Throgmorton Trust, Capital for Industry.

In 1983, GEC Schreiber Limited was reconstructed, such that Hotpoint returned to being under the sole ownership of GEC and Schreiber Industries returned to being owned by the Schreiber family.

=== Bought by the MFI Group ===
Chaim Schreiber died in May 1984 and his son; David took control of the business.

The company closed a manufacturing plant in Hoddesdon in 1984 concentrating all production at the Runcorn factory, and in 1986 made 87 redundancies in an effort to improve the fortunes of the business. 1986 also saw the apparent suicide of Dennis Thomas, company chairman who joined in 1967 when Schreiber merged with his family company, Greaves and Thomas. In August 1987 David Schreiber sold the business in a management buy-in to former Debenhams chairman; Bob Thornton and Betterware owner; Stanley Cohen. The purchase price was undisclosed but thought to be around £16 million and marked the end of Schreiber family involvement in the company.

Schreiber was acquired by the MFI in November 1988 for £35 million cash from Thornton and Cohen. After the acquisition it sat alongside MFI's other well known household brands with Derek Hunt commenting at the time that "Schreiber fits perfectly".

=== Home Retail Group acquisition ===
After MFI went into administration in 2008, the Schreiber Furniture brand together with the Hygena UK and Irish brand rights were bought by the Home Retail Group, the owner of Argos and Homebase, in 2009 and relaunched through those chains.

=== Purchase by Sainsbury's ===
In April 2016, Home Retail Group agreed to a £1.4bn takeover by UK retailer Sainsbury's, including the rights to the Schreiber brand. The acquisition was completed on 2 September 2016.

Sainsbury's quietly dropped the Schreiber brand in 2017, and integrated it into the Argos Home range.

== Operations ==
The Schreiber brand was owned by Sainsbury's and its products were sold in the United Kingdom through Argos stores and the Argos website.

Following the 2016 sale of Homebase to Wesfarmers, all Schreiber branding was removed from both the Homebase stores and the Homebase website in mid-2017 when the agreement with Home Retail Group expired.

The Schreiber brand itself was subsequently dropped and replaced with the Argos Home range in 2017.
