= Autotrak (Cobretti) =

Cobretti Engineering (1989–1999) Autotrak (Cobretti) Limited (since 1999)
- Industry: Automobiles
- Founded: 1989
- Founder: Bob Busbridge, Martin Busbridge
- Headquarters: Morden, London

Autotrak (Cobretti) Limited, previously Cobretti Engineering, is a British manufacturer of automobiles.

== Company history ==
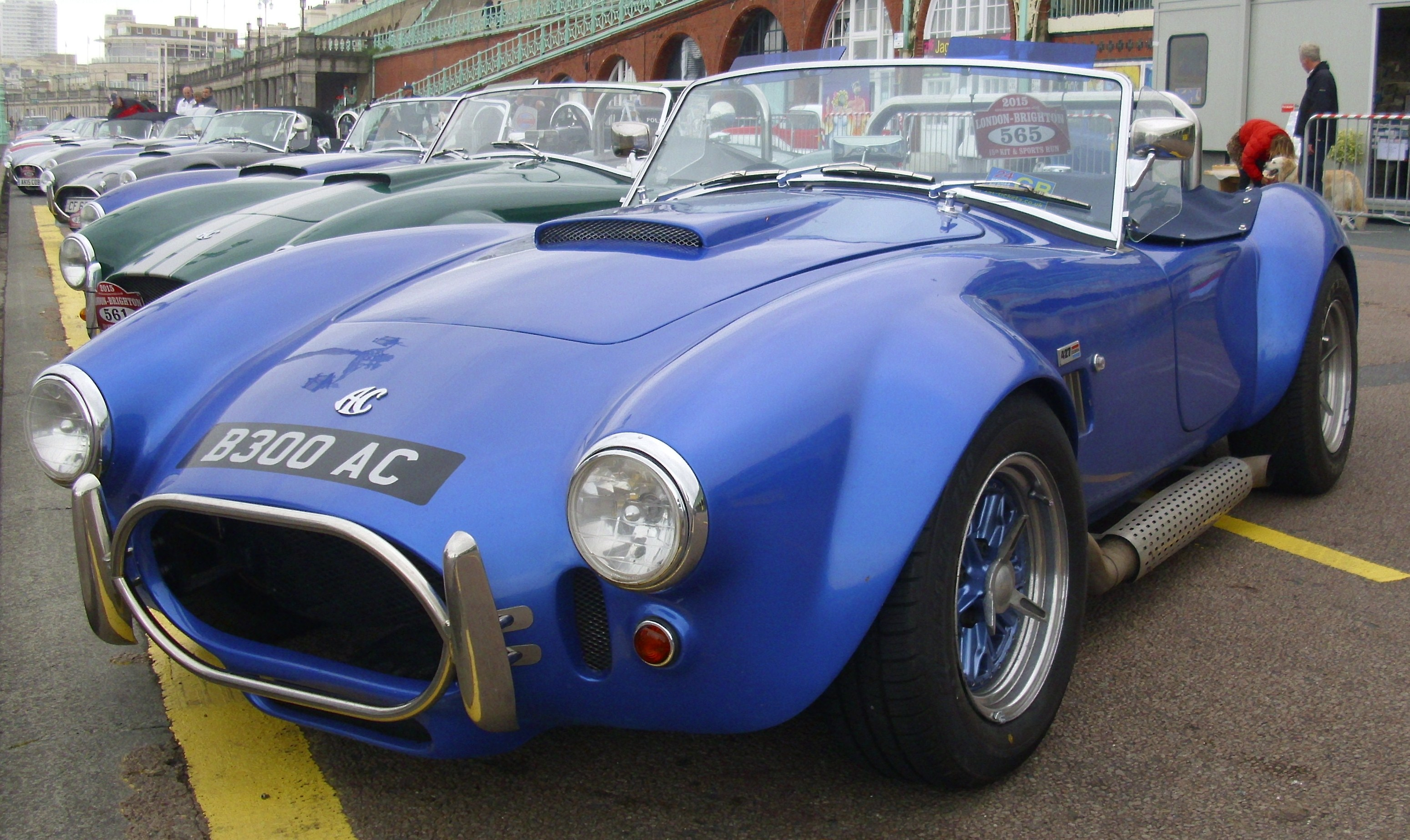
2009 Cobretti

Bob and Martin Busbridge founded Cobretti Engineering in Sutton in the London Borough of Sutton in 1989 . They began producing automobiles and kits. The brand name was Cobretti. In 1992 the company moved to Wallington in the same district. In 1999 the company moved to Morden in the London Borough of Merton and has since operated as Autotrak (Cobretti) Limited . A total of around 85 copies have been created so far.

== Vehicles ==
The only model is the Viper, taken from Brightwheel Replicas. This is the replica of the AC Cobra. The Viper 4 was initially based on the Ford Cortina and later on the Ford Sierra and Ford Granada. A four-cylinder engine powers the vehicle. The Viper V8 is based on a model from Jaguar Cars. A V8 engine, either from Rover or an American manufacturer, powers the vehicle. A twelve-cylinder engine from Jaguar is used in the Viper V12.
