= Eddie Healey =

British entrepreneur (1938–2021)

- Born: Edwin Dyson Healey; 22 April 1938; Kingston upon Hull, East Yorkshire, England
- Died: 21 August 2021 (aged 83); West Ella, East Yorkshire, England
- Spouse: Carol Healey (m. 1966)
- Children: 5
- Relatives: Malcolm Healey (brother)

Edwin Dyson Healey (22 April 1938 – 21 August 2021) was a British billionaire businessman.

== Career ==
He and his brother, Malcolm were born in Kingston upon Hull. They started work in their family's paint firm, and soon started a DIY chain, Status Discount, which grew to have 63 stores in northern England. In 1980, Status was sold to MFI, where Healey worked until 1982.

Healey bought a derelict site in Sheffield, where he built Meadowhall Shopping Centre. In 1999, he sold it to British Land for £1.17 billion, a profit of £420 million.

According to The Sunday Times Rich List in 2020 Eddie and Malcolm Healey's combined net worth was estimated at £2 billion.

== Personal life ==
Healey married Carol in 1966, they had five children, and lived at Westella Hall, Kirk Ella, Yorkshire. Their son James became a Yorkshire amateur golf champion, and turned professional. Another son, Mark Healey, owns Blue Energy, a wind and solar power company.

Shortly after celebrating his wife's 50th birthday in December 1995, he, his wife and two of their sons, Tim and James, one of whom was roughed up, were robbed and held captive in the family's luxurious home, Westella Hall. The robbers crashed their way through the luxury mansion, stealing a reported £250,000 in jewellery and cash, then escaped in a getaway car.

For his 70th birthday party at the Dorchester Hotel in London, Eddie Healey spent £475,000, including £125,000 for a 45-minute set from Girls Aloud, and hired the comedians Russ Abbot and Bobby Davro.

Healey's death, following a long illness, was announced on 21 August 2021. He was 83.
