= Wren Kitchens =

British designer, manufacturer and retailer of kitchens

Wren Kitchens Limited
- Formerly: Wren Kitchens Limited (2009–2013); Wren Living Limited (2013–2017)
- Company type: Private
- Industry: Retail & Manufacturing
- Founded: 22 January 2009; 17 years ago in Howden, United Kingdom; 2020; 6 years ago (United States)
- Defunct: 23 April 2026; 54 days ago (United States)
- Headquarters: Barton-upon-Humber, United Kingdom
- Number of locations: 106 (2021)
- Area served: United Kingdom
- Key people: Malcolm Healey (Owner); Mark Pullan (Managing Director)
- Products: Kitchens; Bedrooms
- Revenue: ▲£699.1 million (2020)
- Number of employees: 4,500+ (2017)
- Website: wrenkitchens.com

Wren Kitchens Limited is a privately owned British designer, manufacturer, and retailer of fitted kitchens, and fitted bedrooms. It has 106 stores.

== History ==
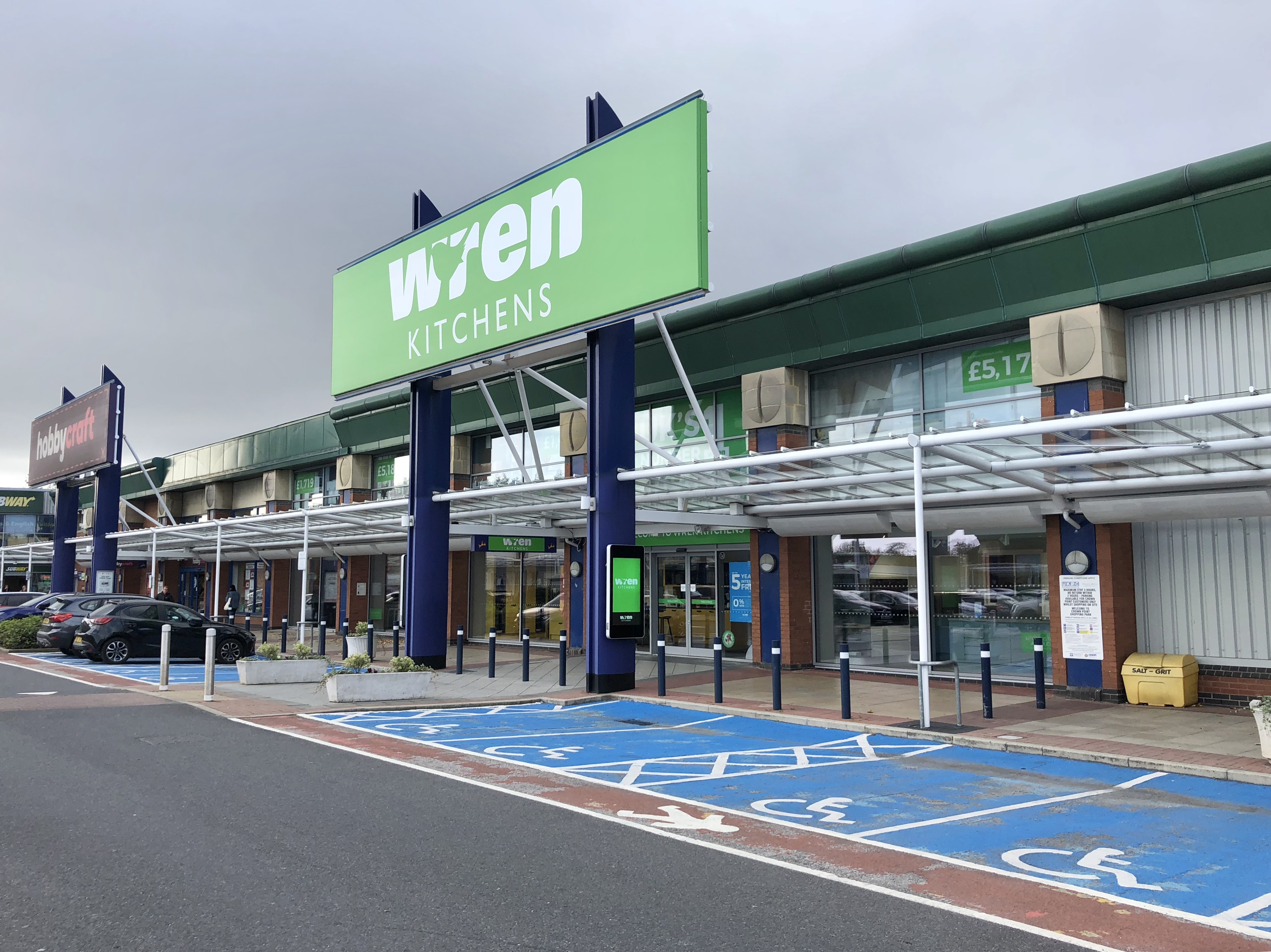
Wren Kitchens, Leeds, Crown Point Shopping Park

Wren Kitchens was founded in 2009. The management team behind Wren traded for 10 years in the United States before the business was sold and the team moved back to the United Kingdom.

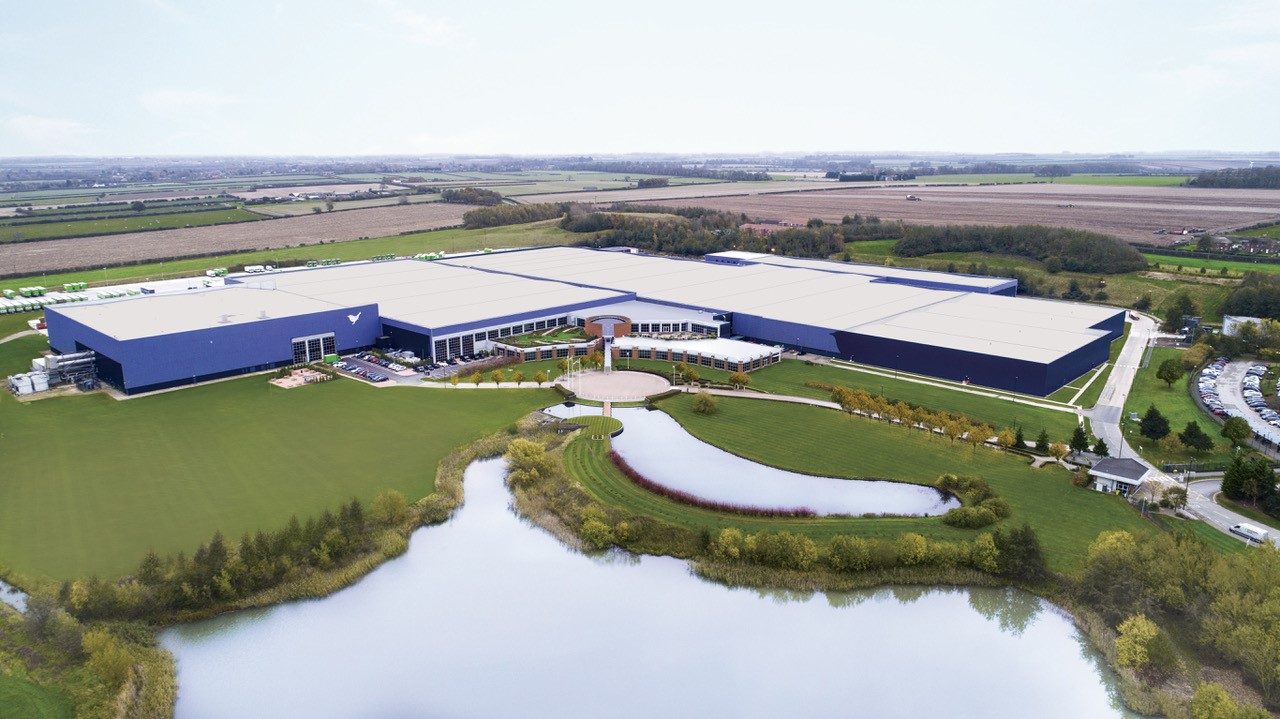
The Nest, Wren Kitchens headquarters, Barton-upon-Humber

The company employs over 4,000 people and is one of the largest employers in the Humber region, and was in 2019 named Retail Employer of the Year by jobs website Indeed. In 2016, the firm reported record turnover growth as sales surged past £338 million. This also grew in 2017, with reported revenue of £406 million.

In 2019, Wren reported a new record turnover of £490.1 million for the financial year ending 31 December 2018, an increase of 20.7%, and a pre-tax profit of £37.1 million, up 124% year-on-year. The company said it believed there was a significant opportunity for further growth in the UK and beyond.

On 23 April 2026, after just 6 years of operation, Wren Kitchens ceased operations in the United States, closing all showrooms and studios located inside The Home Depot locations across the Northeast. The company claimed that sales were down over 30% in 2025, and that it no longer had enough cash to keep operating in the US. Over 300 employees were laid off by the end of that day. Wren Kitchens would file for Chapter 7 bankruptcy liquidation on 27 April, listing assets and liabilities between $100 million and $500 million.

== Manufacturing ==
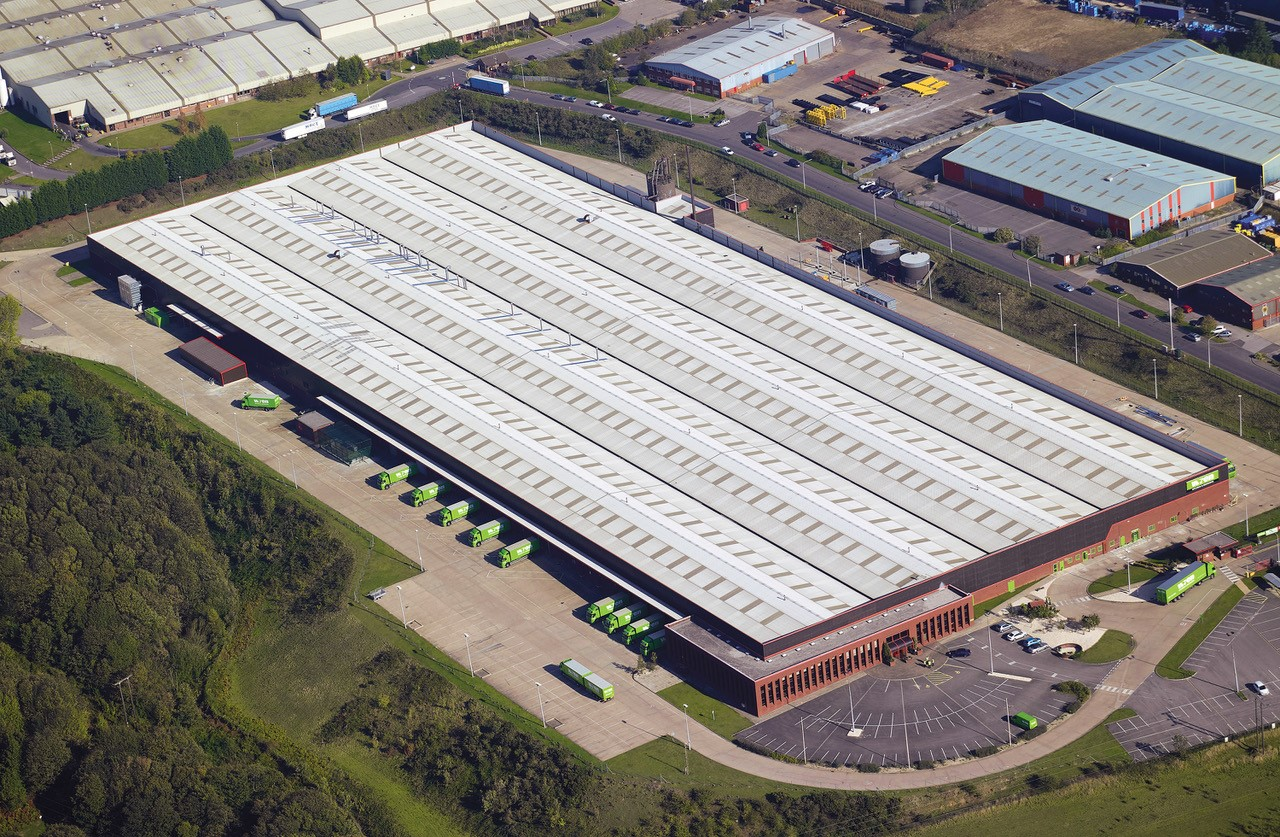
Wren Kitchens Scunthorpe manufacturing facility (500,000 sq ft).

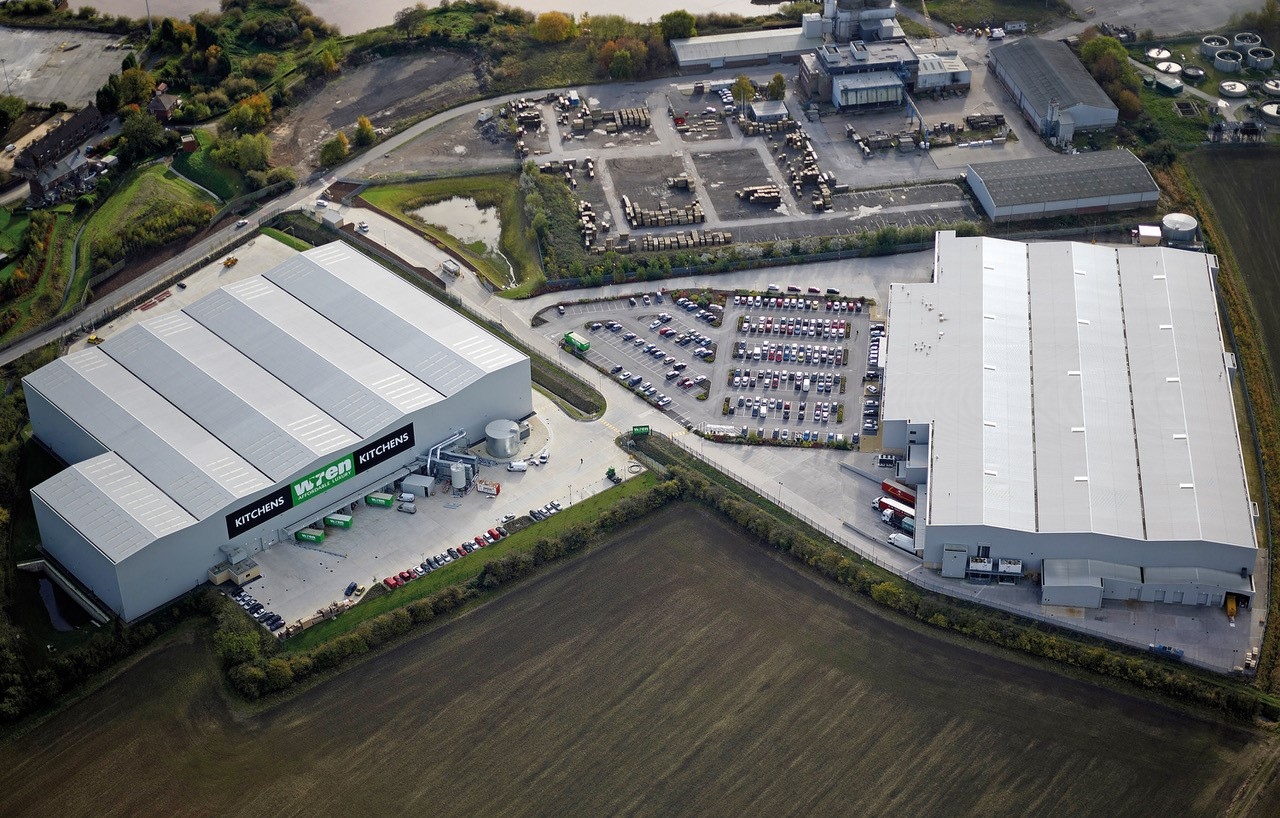
Wren Kitchens Howden manufacturing facility (250,000 sq ft).

Until December 2013, the headquarters were in Howden, in the East Riding of Yorkshire, United Kingdom, where it still operates a factory. Wren manufactures all of its kitchen units in its own production plants in Scunthorpe, Howden and Barton-upon-Humber. The 180 acre Barton-upon-Humber site was acquired in August 2013 from Kimberly-Clark. In January 2019, Wren Kitchens signed up for a 150,000 sq ft warehouse at the Humber Enterprise Park, near Hull.

Wren has been awarded FIRA International Gold Certification by The Furniture Industry Research Association, the recognised quality mark for products or installation services within the furniture and kitchen industries. It has received the award for its products in 2014 and for its installation standards in 2017. In 2018, Wren introduced the world’s first 3D online kitchen planner for its customers, making it easier for them to choose colours and units.

Wren information advisor Ryan Beecham, who raps in his spare time under the name CiVil, became an unwitting YouTube star when his kitchen-based rap ‘The Wren Difference’ was turned into an online advert, which has been viewed more than 1.5m times and attracted national media coverage.

In 2019, Wren was awarded the Made In Britain marque. Made In Britain brings together the best manufacturers in the UK, through the use of its registered collective mark, guaranteeing that members’ products are made in Britain and comply to the highest standards.

In 2019, The British Furniture Manufacturers (BFM), a trade association that represents the interests of the British furniture industry, welcomed Wren Kitchens into the association as an ‘Approved Member’.

Wren offered to find jobs for up to 280 staff at Kingstown Furniture in Hull, which closed its doors in March 2019. By June 2019, over 40 former Kingstown Furniture staff had secured positions with Wren. It plans to open up to 18 new showrooms during the year and is currently delivering manufacturing more than 2,000 kitchens a week at its three production sites.

In June 2019, Wren announced plans for a £120 million expansion of its manufacturing headquarters in Barton-upon-Humber, North Lincolnshire, almost doubling manufacturing output to keep up with growing consumer demand. Wren is seeking planning permission for a new 910,000 sq. ft. facility, which to be built behind the existing Wren factory on part of its 180-acre site, which has been earmarked for further development. The new factory will create up to 1,200 new manufacturing jobs with additional roles in engineering, IT, customer service and product development. The project, once completed, will be the single largest investment in the company’s history.

== Controversy ==
In 2015, Wren Kitchens was investigated by BBC Watchdog for providing customers with poor customer service. The investigation found that the company had provided partial orders to customers and was extremely slow to rectify issues. The firm responded by stating that they are heavily investing in improving their customer service department.

In Spring 2016, the firm was one of 12 kitchen brands researched by the consumer association Which?. WrenLiving came second from last out of the 12 kitchen companies assessed.

In March 2016 the firm was fined £12,000 after pleading guilty to breaking the Unfair Trading Regulations 2008, Regulation 9 and the European Communities Act 1972 Section 2(2), by misleading customers on kitchen pricing.

== Charity work and community ==
In March 2014, Wren Kitchens donated £437,080 to charities supporting victims of the 2013-14 United Kingdom winter floods. The firm has also raised money for children's cancer charity CLIC Sargent and Macmillan Cancer Support.

Wren Kitchens said it would "match all B&Q quotes" for customers and had "opened vacancies" to the 400 design consultants whose jobs were at risk at competitor B&Q following a restructure.

== Awards and achievements ==
- Best Kitchen Retailer – Your Home Awards 2018
- 23rd – 2017 Sunday Times Top Track 250
- 12th – 2018 Sunday Times Top Track 250
- 3rd – 2016 fastest growing retailers, OC&C Strategy Consultants and Financo Retail Growth Index
- 2nd – Indeed's 25 Top-Rated UK Workplaces: Best in the Private Sector (2018)
- 1st – Indeed's 15 Top-Rated UK Workplaces: Best in the Retail Sector (2019)
