= Chaim Schreiber =

British furniture manufacturer

Chaim Samuel Schreiber (18 May 1918 – May 1984) was a Polish-born British furniture manufacturer, who founded Schreiber Furniture in 1957.

Schreiber was the only one in his family who survived the Holocaust. After escaping mainland Europe to Britain, during World War II, Schreiber worked at De Havilland Industries, designing the wings of the Mosquito fighter-bomber.

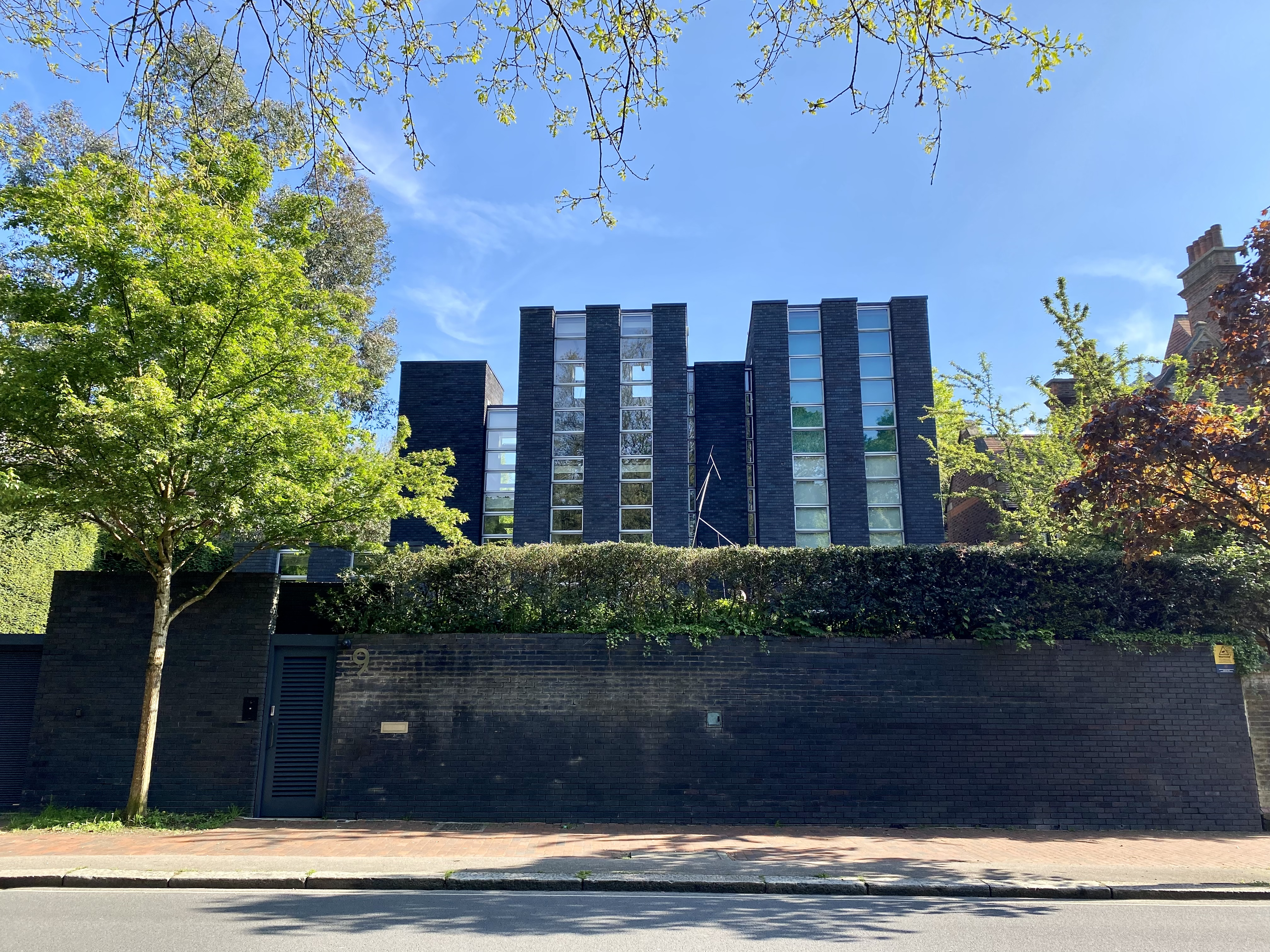
Schreiber House, seen in 2024

In 1963-64, he commissioned Scottish architect James Gowan to build a house (now known as Schreiber House) on West Heath Road, overlooking Hampstead Heath. The house is Grade II listed and was for sale in March 2025 for £11 million. Almost two decades later, in 1982, Gowan designed a second house for Schreiber, in Chester.

In 1942, he married Sara Weinstock in London. She was the daughter of Rabbi Dovid Weinstock, who was killed by the Nazis in Buchenwald concentration camp on 16 October 1939. Sara had arrived in London from Vienna with her two older sisters, on a Kindertransport in December 1938. In 2024, she celebrated her 100th birthday. They had three children.

He is buried at the Adath Yisroel Cemetery, Enfield.
