= Alba (electronics) =

British electronics company defunct since 2022

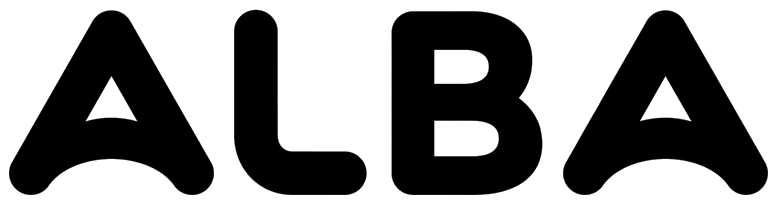
- Alba logo 2015 to 2022
- Product type: Electronics
- Current owner: J Sainsbury plc
- Introduced: 1917
- Discontinued: 2022
- Previous owners: Home Retail Group (2008–2016); Harvard International Ltd/Alba plc (1982–2008); ALBA (Radio & Television) Ltd. (1960–1982)

Alba was a British consumer electronics company and brand name that produced budget electronics. Its origins date to 1917 when it became active in the radio and TV industry as A.J. Balcombe Ltd.

Following the demise of the original company in the early 1980s, the brand was purchased by distributor Harvard International, which in turn rebranded itself as Alba plc. In addition to Alba, the company subsequently acquired or licensed numerous other brands, including Bush, and became popular in the low-end market in the UK.

In 2008, it reverted to its old name and sold both the Alba and Bush brands to the Home Retail Group, the parent company of the retailer Argos, which was in turn was taken over by J Sainsbury plc in 2016. The Alba brand was quietly dropped by Sainsbury's in 2022 in favour of its more upmarket sister brand Bush. Harvard International retains the rights to the brand for Australia and New Zealand.

== History ==
=== Original Alba company (c.1917–1982) ===
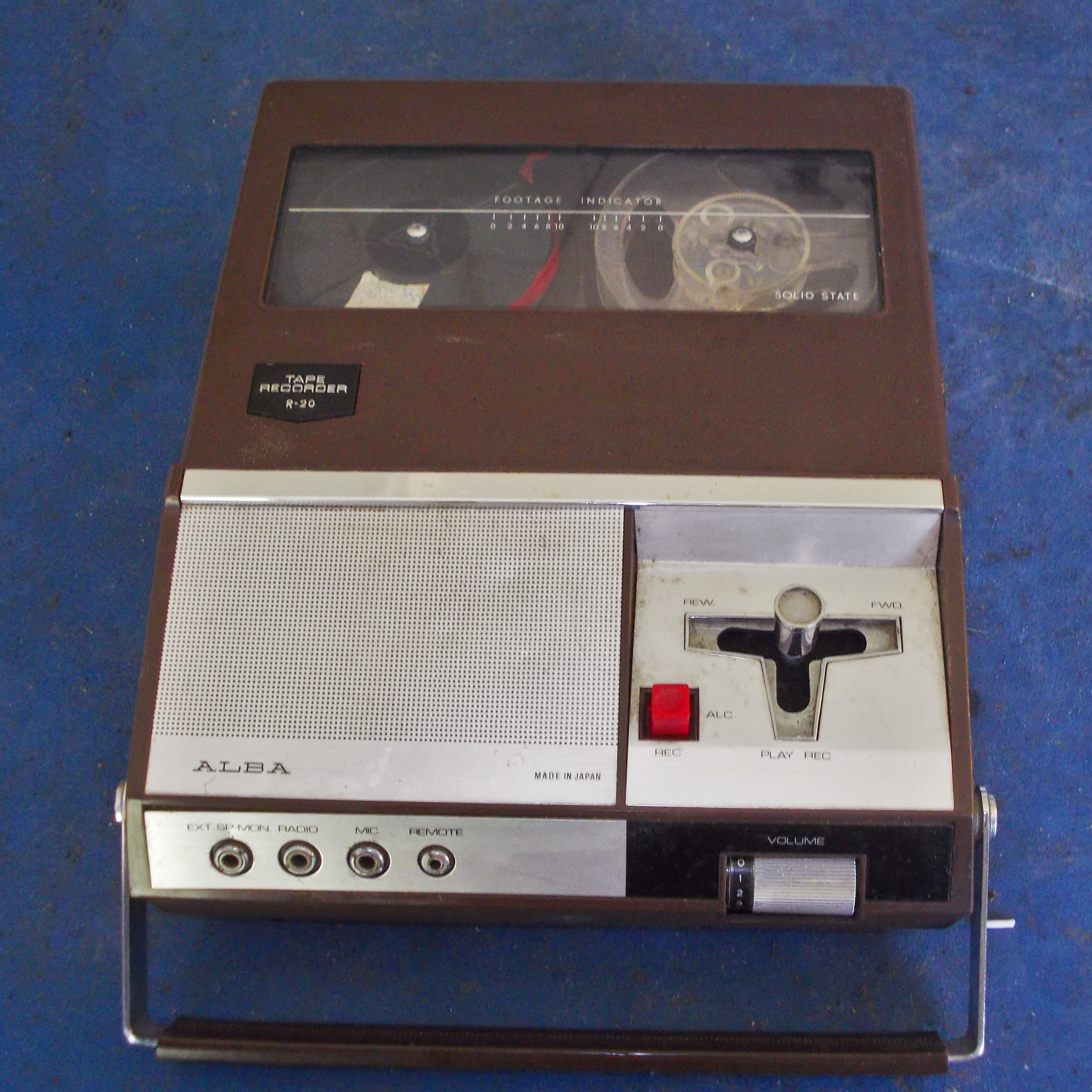
Alba-branded reel-to-reel tape recorder made in Japan (based on a Sanyo)

The name Alba originated as a trademark used on radio and television produced by A.J. Balcombe Ltd. The company was formed in 1917 or 1918 by Alfred Balcombe. Alba began by manufacturing radio sets from 1922, from a factory at Tabernacle Street in London. It was a significant contributor to the development of the British radio & TV industry.

In the 1960s they became Alba Group, and made only low-cost consumer products.

Alba went into receivership in June 1982.

=== Alba Group of Companies (1982–2008) ===
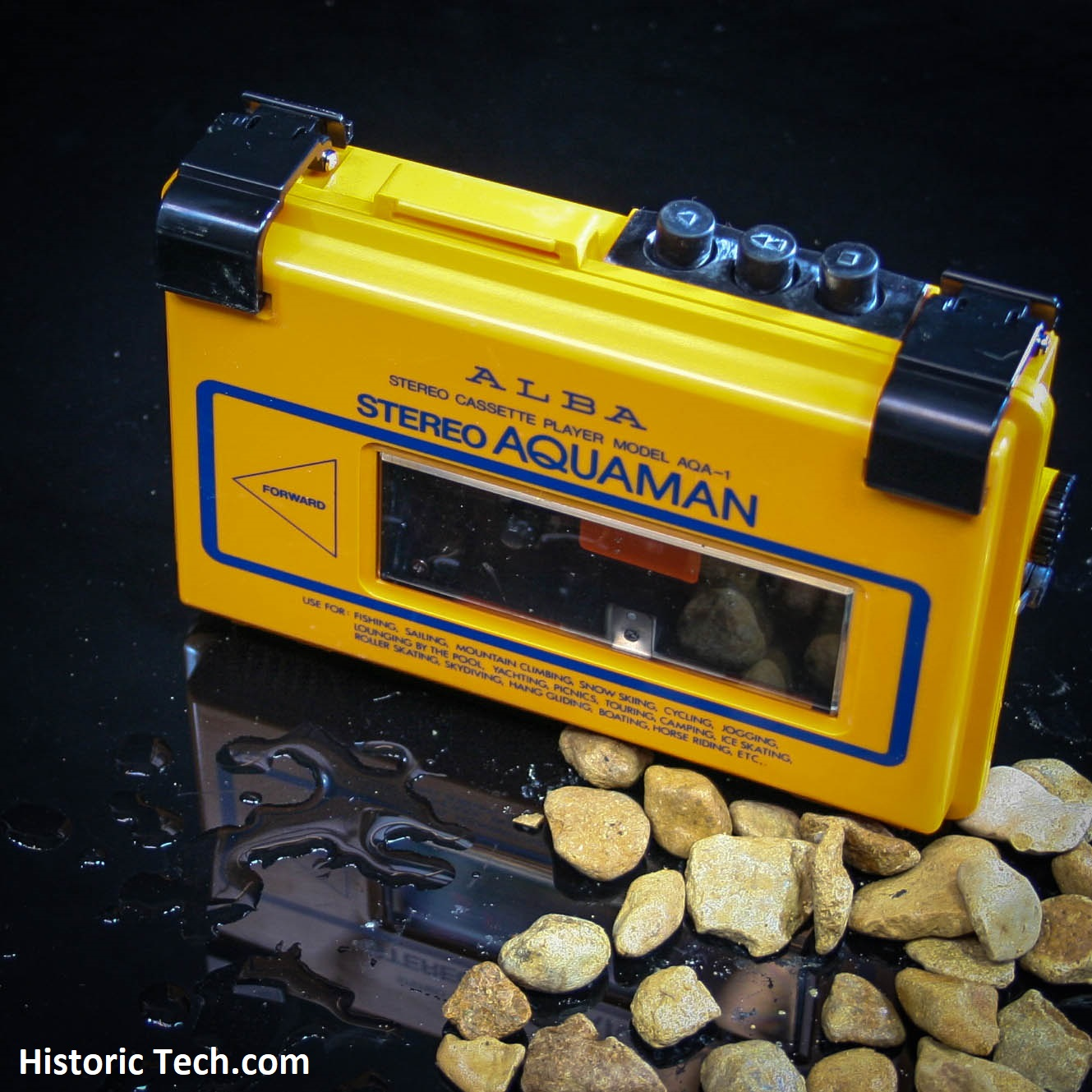
An Alba "Aquaman" personal stereo cassette player, released in 1983

Following the demise of the original company, the Alba name was bought in 1982 by Harvard International Ltd (formerly Harris Overseas Ltd), an import business founded by John Harris. In August 1987, Harvard International renamed itself to Alba plc and was floated on the London Stock Exchange under its new name. Alba plc bought Bush Radio in 1988 and then Goodmans Industries in 1994. Harris was succeeded as CEO by his son Daniel Harris in 1992.

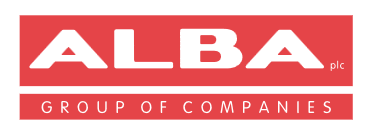
Logo of Alba plc

Along with its own Alba brand and Bush and Goodmans audio visual products, the company also made other products including as Hinari (home appliances), Roadster (portable entertainment), Breville (home appliances), Power Devil (DIY tools), Dirt Devil and others. Alba plc also produced electronic products under licence for other companies or individuals, including Ministry of Sound (audio products), Antony Worrall Thompson, Cable and Wireless, Carl Lewis, JCB, Ministry of Sound, Nicky Clarke and NTL.

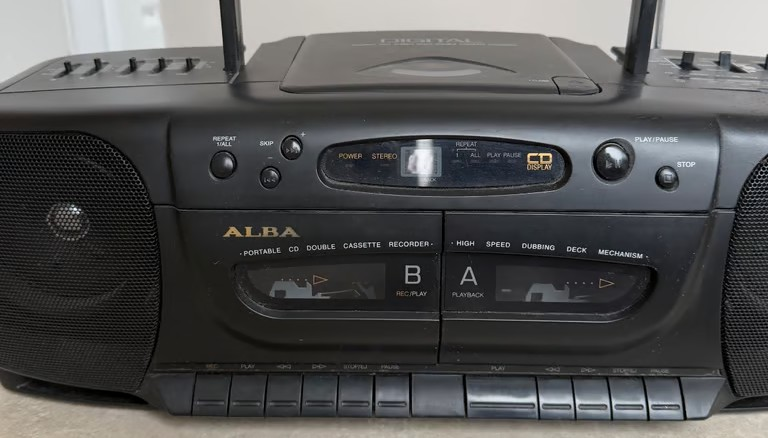
Alba branded boombox from the 1990s

Alba itself did not own factories but contracted manufacturing out to the Far East. TVs sold under the Alba and Bush brands were manufactured by Vestel in Turkey, as of 1999.

As of 2006, the Alba group was selling one million TVs, two million MP3 players and a million microwaves in the UK annually, and had product managers and designers from around the world.

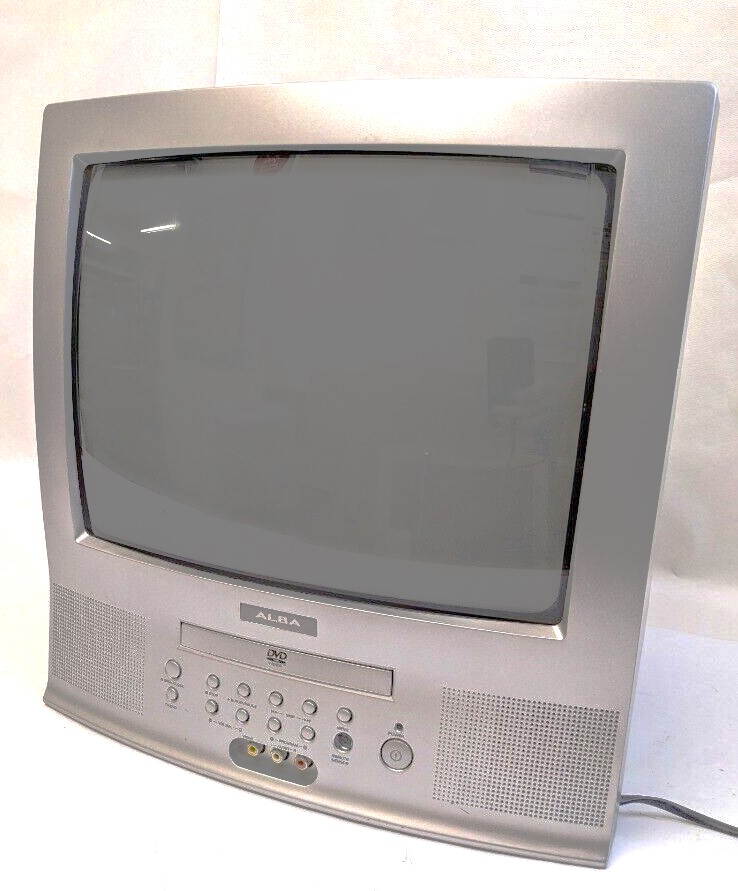
Alba CRT TV with built-in DVD player

The company sold its leisure division to private equity firm Rutland Partners in August 2007 for £51.5 million. This included Breville, Hinari and Bush Domestic Appliances as well as some licensed brands. The company sold its share of the Grundig brand for £25.5 million in December 2007, although it retained the UK distribution rights until 2010.

=== Under the Home Retail Group and Sainsbury's (2008–2022) ===
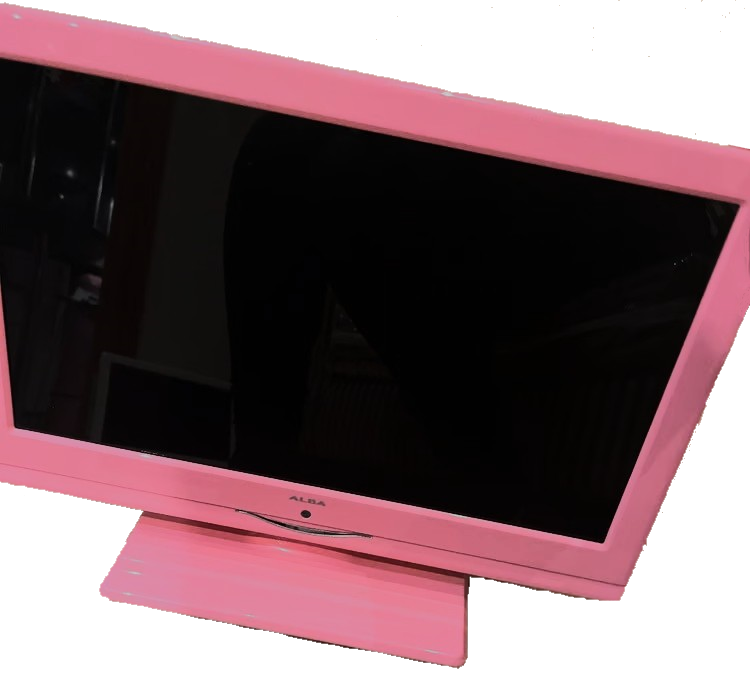
Pink Alba-branded television set

In November 2008, the Alba group sold its Alba and Bush names to Home Retail Group, the then parent company of retailers Homebase and Argos, for £15.25 million. As a result, Alba plc reverted to its previous name, Harvard International plc, the following year, and would continue to market a number of other brands such as Goodmans, iLuv, Disney-branded electrics and Kinetik and Sonetik medical devices.

Under Home Retail Group ownership, products bearing the Alba brand name were exclusively sold at their Argos and Homebase stores. In August 2015, the Alba logo was refreshed with a new, modernised look. In September 2016, the supermarket chain Sainsbury's completed its acquisition of Home Retail Group, bringing Argos, along with the Alba and Bush brands, under its ownership.

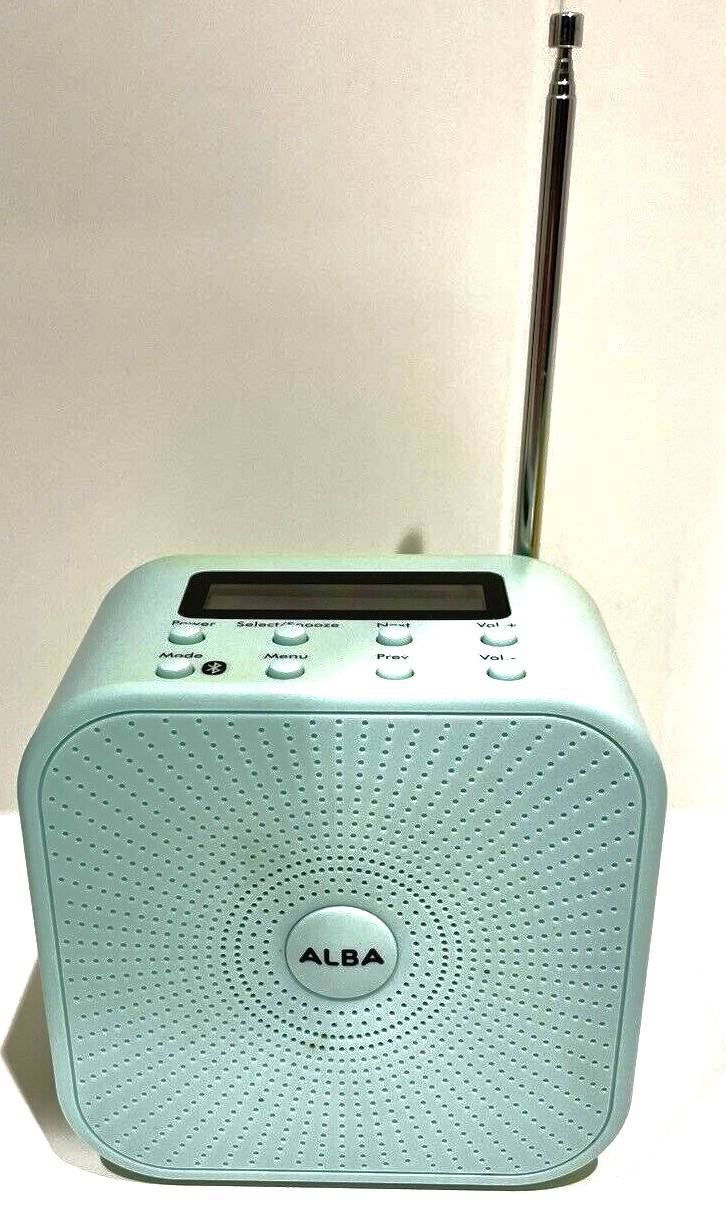
An Alba branded DAB radio using its rebrand

The Alba brand was dropped by Sainsbury's in 2022 and replaced by the Bush brand. However, Harvard International still owns the Alba brand in Australia and New Zealand and continues to market it in those countries.
