= Malcolm Healey =

British entrepreneur (born 1944)

- Born: Malcolm Stanley Healey; June 1944 (age 81); Kingston upon Hull, East Yorkshire, England
- Children: 3
- Relatives: Eddie Healey (brother)

Malcolm Stanley Healey (born June 1944) is a British entrepreneur.

== Early life ==
He and his brother, Eddie were born in Kingston upon Hull.

== Career ==
Healey began his career in his family's paint company.

In 1982 MFI and Healey's company, Humber Kitchens, bought Hygena, a kitchen and furniture retail company, from Norcros who were looking to dissolve the company and sell the Hygena name. MFI took full control of Hygena in 1987, buying Healey out for £200 million.

Healey then moved to the US, where he established kitchen manufacturing company Mill's Pride, which he later sold for £800 million before moving back to the UK. During the 1990s, Healey lived in Palm Beach, Florida.

In 2009, he founded Wren Living, now known as Wren Kitchens, a kitchen manufacturing and retail company which as of the beginning of 2019 had 82 showrooms across the UK, with an annual turnover in 2018 of £490 million.

As of 2020, Healey's West Retail Group also owned the online electronics retailer Ebuyer.

In 2019, Healey donated £250,000 to the Conservative Party two weeks after its leader Boris Johnson became prime minister. He has donated £2,210,000 to the Conservative Party since 2017.

In the 2021 Sunday Times Rich List, Healey and family were listed as the 70th wealthiest family in the UK, with an estimated net wealth of £1.43 billion.

In February 2026, Malcom Healey was listed on the Sunday Times Tax list with an estimated £39.1 million.

== Personal life ==
Healey owns Warter Priory, a 12,000-acre estate near Pocklington, which he purchased in 1998 for a reported £48 million. It has about 50 shooting drives and was reported in 2023 to be worth over £1 billion.

Malcolm Healey had three children. His daughter, Suzy, was found strangled at her country home in August 2005. Richard Holtby, her ex-fiancé, was convicted of manslaughter and sentenced to eight and a half years in prison by a jury at Kingston upon Hull Crown Court in June 2006.
