= Bush (electronics brand) =

British consumer electronics brand

- Product type: Consumer electronics
- Current owner: Argos (Sainsbury's); Harvard International (Bush Australia; in Oceania)
- Introduced: 1932 as Bush Radio
- Previous owners: Home Retail Group (2008–2016); Alba Group (1988–2008)

Bush is a British consumer electronics brand owned by Sainsbury's via its subsidiary Argos, both of which exclusively sell Bush products. In Australia and New Zealand, the Bush brand is owned and used separately by Harvard International.

The brand has existed since the 1930s and originated as a London-based company named Bush Radio.

Bush Radio was one of the most famous manufacturers of early British radio receivers in the mid 20th century. The original company became defunct in 1962 when it merged with Murphy Radio, but the Bush brand name survives as a private label brand for budget electronics, becoming the most popular brand in the UK for smaller-size TVs in the 1990s and has since also become popular for products such as smart TVs, tablets and white goods as of 2015.

== History ==
=== Bush Radio company ===
The company was founded in 1932 as Bush Radio from the remains of the Graham Amplion company, which had made horn loudspeakers as a subsidiary of the Gaumont British Picture Corporation. The brand name comes from Gaumont's Shepherd's Bush studios. Bush Radio Ltd expanded rapidly moving to a new factory at Power Road, Chiswick in 1936.

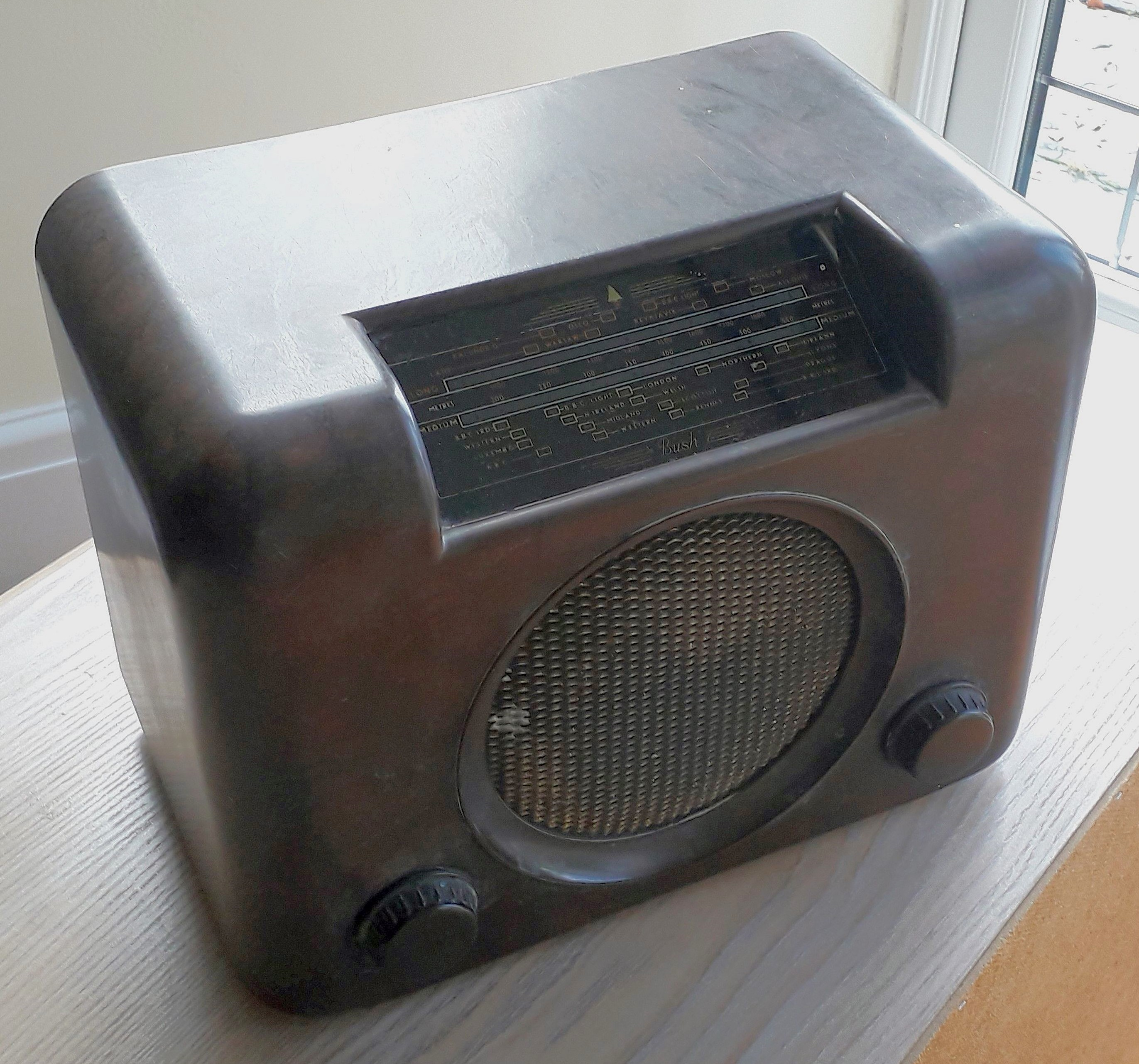
Bush DAC90A valve radio, successor of the hugely popular DAC90

Bush became part of the Rank empire in 1945 when it was acquired by Cinema-Television, a subsidiary of Gaumont-British. A brand new factory was opened at Ernesettle, Plymouth in 1949. In 1946 the DAC90, designed by Frank Middleditch, featured in the V&A exhibition Britain Can Make It. The original model in black became very popular and was succeeded by the DAC90A in other colours, and export models with dials in different languages.

In 1950 the DAC10 radios were launched, along with the distinctive TV22 television.

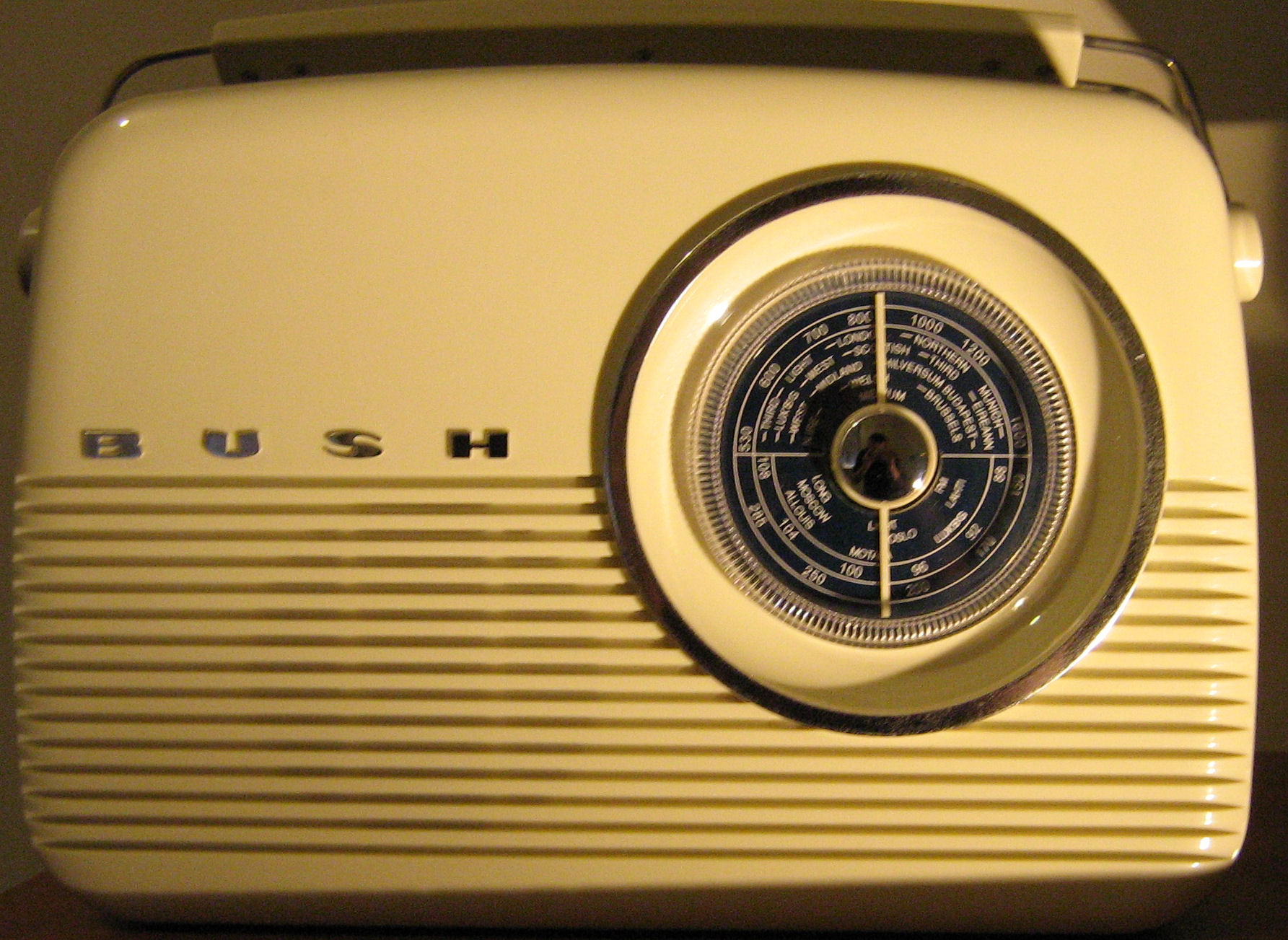
The TR82 transistor portable radio from 1959 was a design icon of the early transistor radios. Pictured here is a reproduction model released in the 2000s.

The Bush TR82 transistor radio, designed by Ogle Design, and launched in 1959, is regarded as an icon of early radio design. Although the first radio to use the Ogle cabinet design was actually the MB60, a battery/mains valve set from 1957 to 1959.

The original Bush Radio company merged with Murphy Radio on 4 June 1962, and a new company was formed called Rank Bush Murphy Ltd. In 1978, Rank Bush Murphy was sold to British conglomerate Great Universal Stores.

Rank formed a joint venture with Toshiba in 1978 called Rank Toshiba, and manufactured Toshiba designed televisions in Ernesettle, Plymouth, England. In 1980 Rank terminated its agreement with Toshiba and the joint company was wound up. Toshiba took over the UK factory and continued to manufacture television sets alone.

=== Brand since the 1980s ===
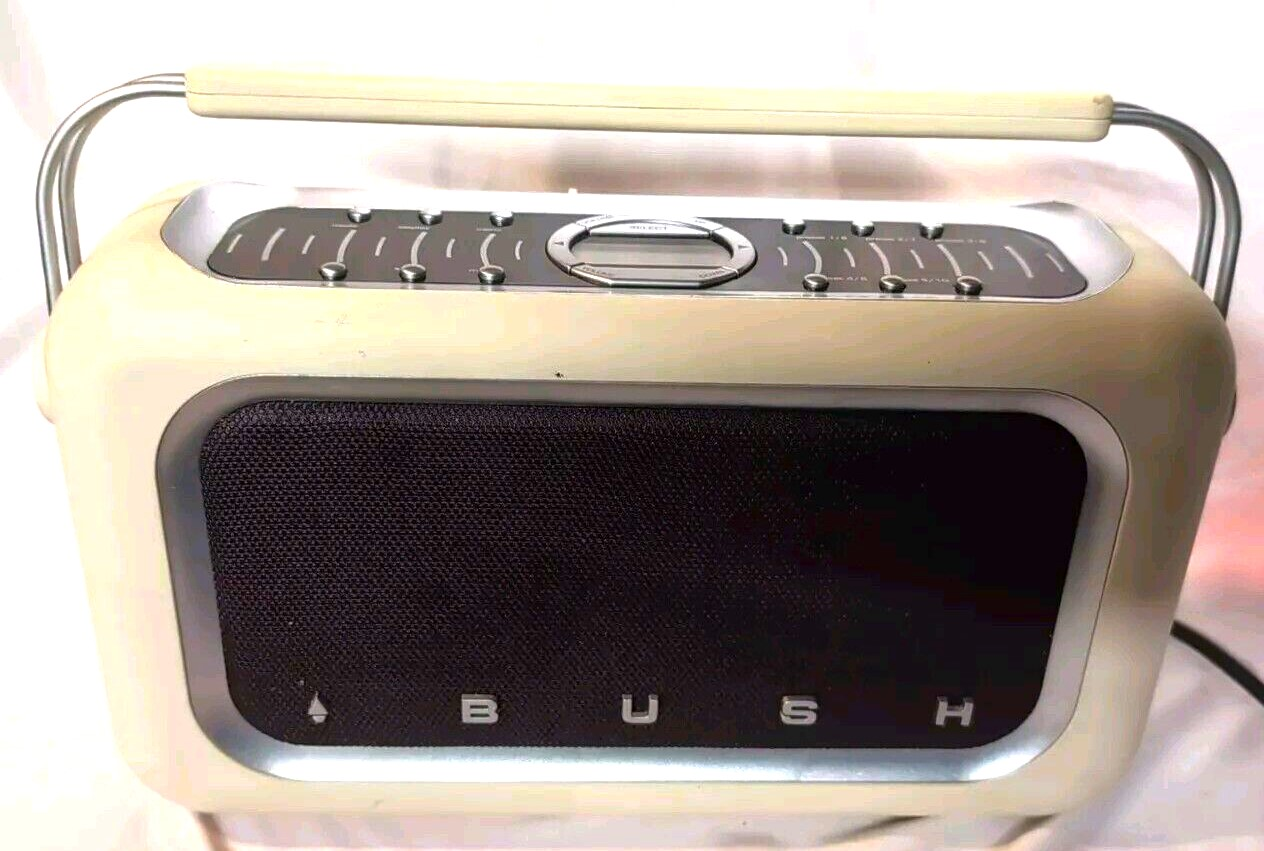
The retro style TR2003DAB was the first ever digital radio (DAB) by Bush, released in 2003

In 1981, two young entrepreneurs, Mark Flutter and Richard Schlagman, purchased the Bush brand name trademark from Rank for £600,000. They refreshed the brand on the high street with imported products including radio alarms, cassette recorders and hi-fi systems. It successfully revitalised the brand and led to it being floated as Bush Radio plc in 1984. In March 1986, Prestwich Holdings agreed to acquire Bush Radio for £15 million.

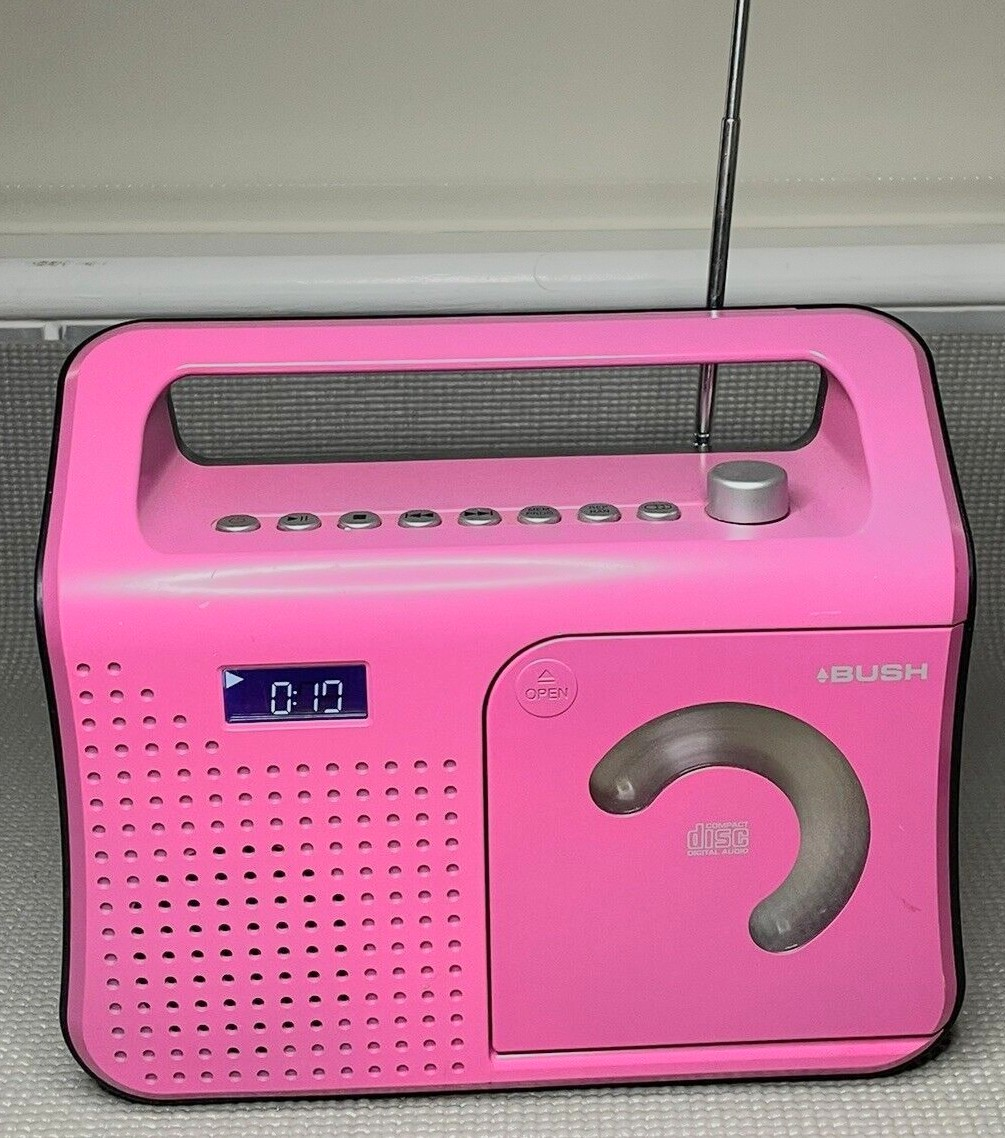
Bush pink radio receiver with CD player

In May 1988, Bush was acquired by Alba plc for £6 million. Under the Alba Group, Bush products once again became common, being used primarily on imported electronic goods. In November 2008, the Bush brand name, along with Alba, was purchased by Home Retail Group, the parent company of Homebase and Argos, for £15.25 million. As a result, the former Alba Group reverted to its original name of Harvard International. Harvard International still owns the Bush brand in Oceania.

In September 2016, the British supermarket chain Sainsbury's completed its acquisition of Home Retail Group, bringing Argos, along with the Alba and Bush brands, under its ownership. In 2022 the Bush brand replaced the Alba brand, enabling Sainsbury's to have one main own brand electronics brand.

=== Logo history ===
Bush Radio logo circa 1935.

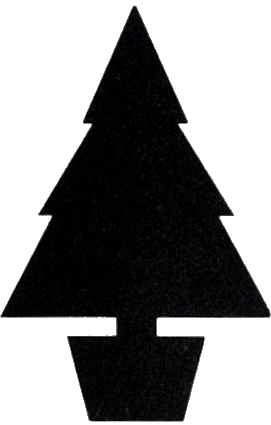
A variant of the Bush Radio tree symbol circa 1960s

Bush logo in the 1960s. The tree icon was removed around 1970 but restored in 1981.

Bush logo until 2015 and the most recent featuring a tree icon.

Bush iD, a former branding used until 2008 for certain products.

== Product range ==
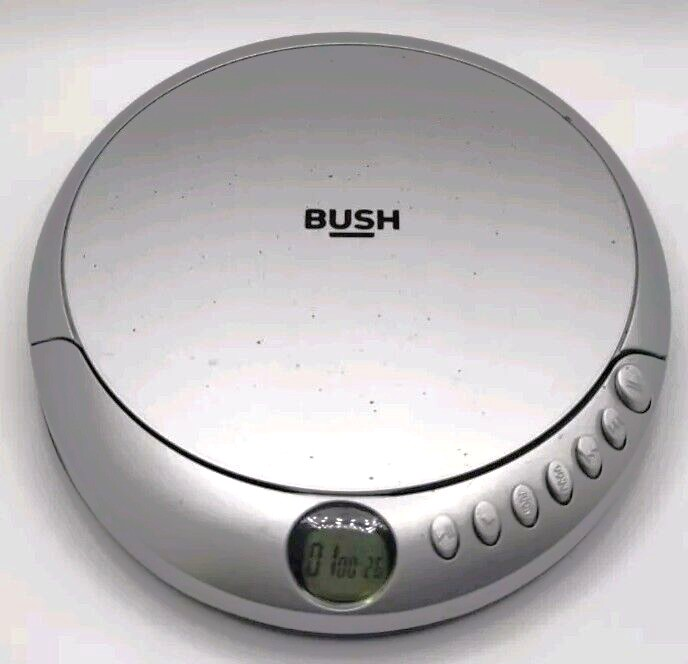
Bush portable CD player

Bush makes or has made many kinds of products including: televisions, boomboxes, shelf stereos, set-top boxes, washing machines, radios, trimmers, headsets, headphones, ovens, cookers, fridges, computer mice, webcams, microphones, turntables, DVD players, Blu-ray players, home cinemas, MP3 players, MP4 players, dishwashers, vacuum cleaners, camcorders, smartphones and tablets.

=== Radios and TVs ===
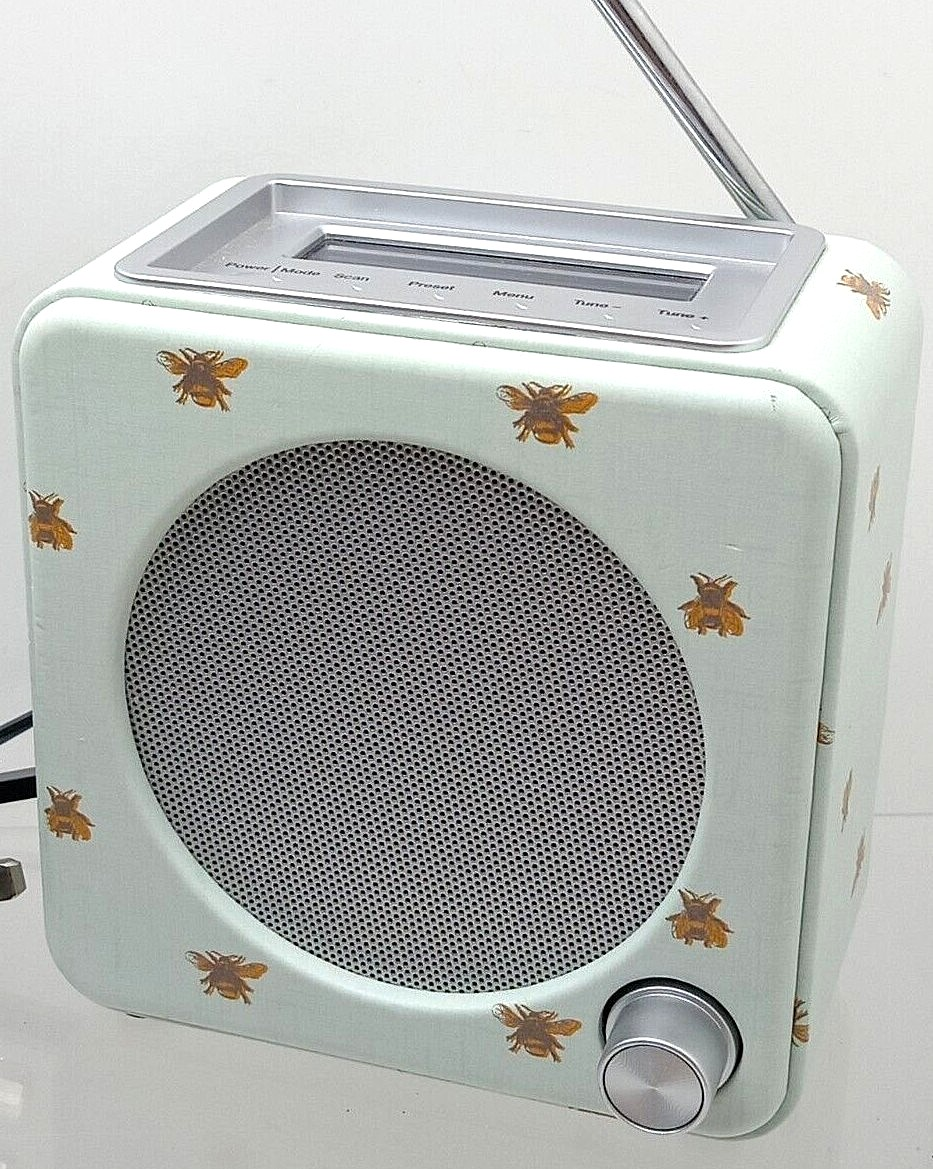
Bush Classic Mini digital radio in bee pattern skin, late 2010s

Reproductions of classic Bush Radio models from the 1950s and 1960s have also been created under the Bush brand. Some of these units also include DAB tuners. The TR82DAB, a reproduction of the classic TR82, was launched in 2006.

In 2000, the Bush Internet TV was launched in partnership with Virgin.net. Although it rapidly increased Alba plc's share price, public disinterest in the product led to it becoming a failure. Alba wrote off the investment in the Bush Internet product and platform in November 2001.

As part of a rebrand in 2015, a new Bush Classic range was also launched consisting of vintage style DAB radios as well as fridge freezers. The Classic range also led to wooden cased radios and turntables.

In 2024, the first Bush TVs with Freely were released.

=== White goods ===
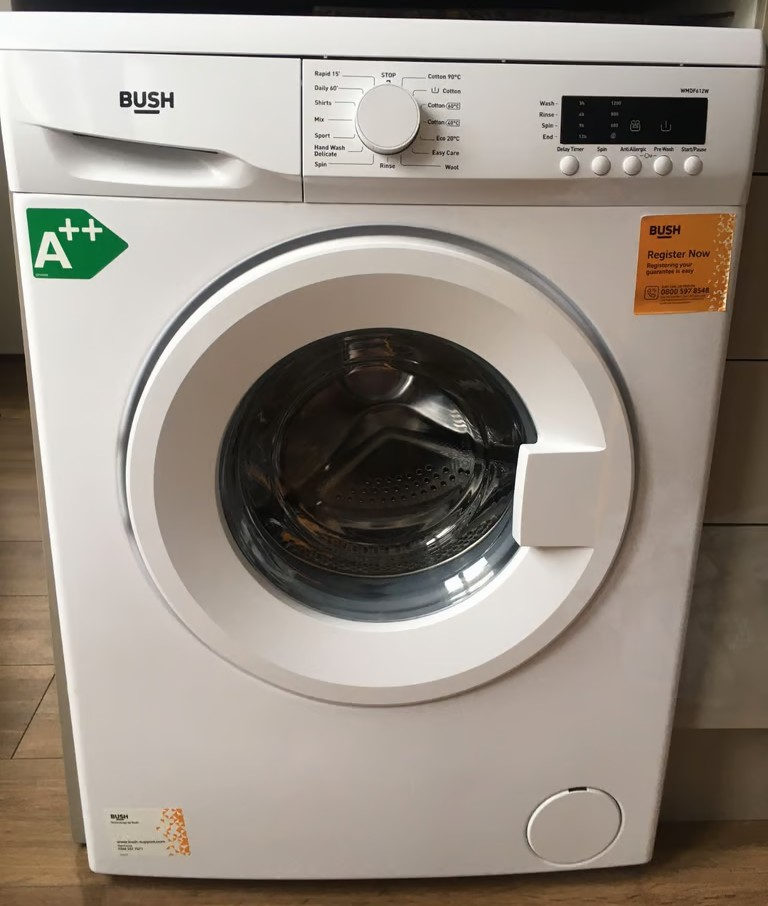
A Bush washing machine.

At least some of the Bush TV sets and some white goods are made by Turkish company Vestel.

=== Portables ===
In 2013 a 7-inch tablet computer called MyTablet was released under the Bush brand; it cost £99.99. It was designed to compete against the Tesco Hudl. MyTablet was noted to be a flop, and a newer tablet called Bush Spira B1 was introduced in 2015. In 2016, the Bush Spira E3X Android smartphone was released for a budget price of £199.99.

== Issues ==
In 2016, Argos recalled a Bush 9-inch portable DVD player product due to safety issues with its power adapter. In 2019, Argos issued a safety alert stating that some Bush tumble dryers may pose a fire risk. A warning was also issued for the Bush LSBBDFO double oven.

== Gallery ==
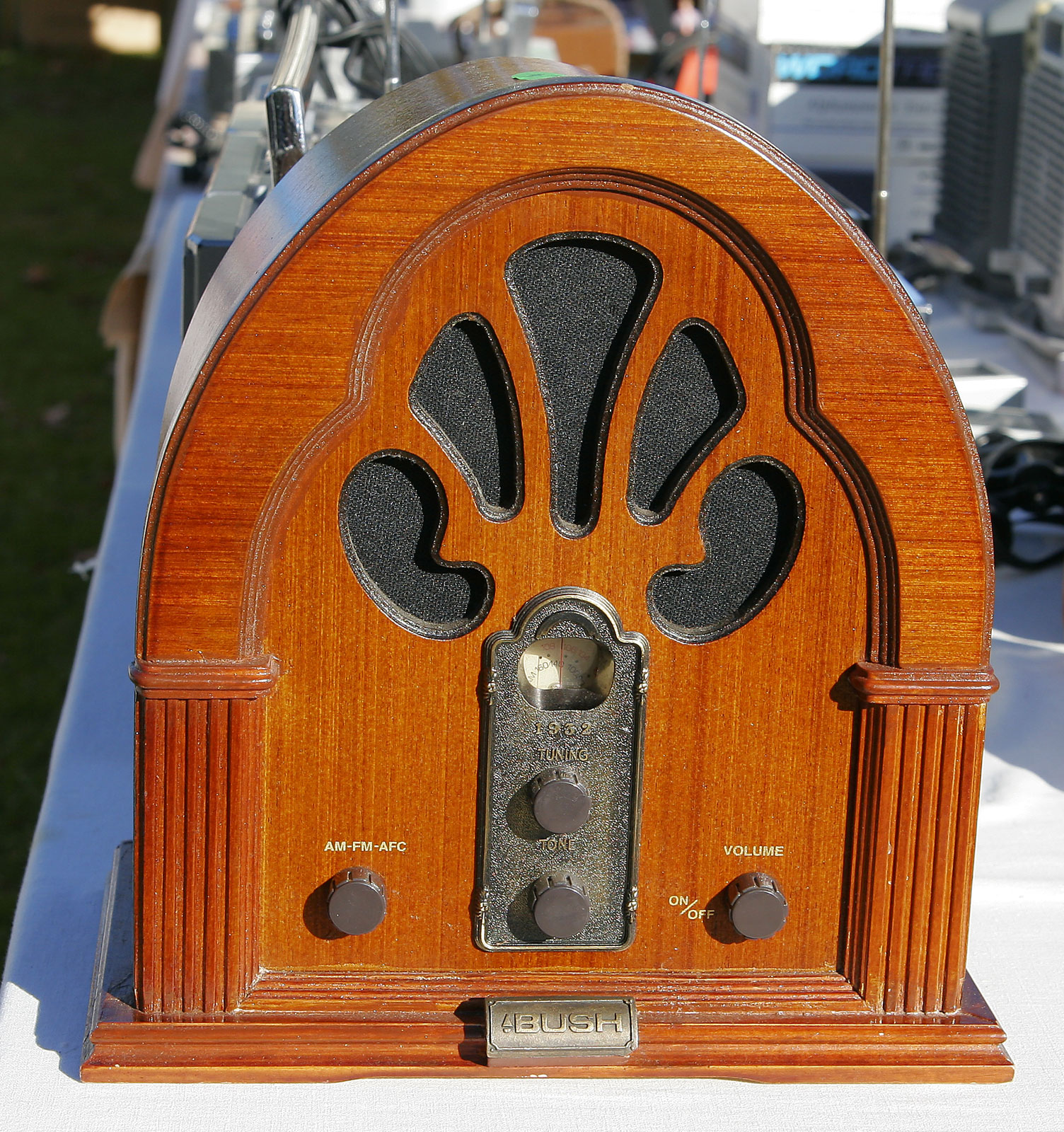
Bush brand reproduction of the Philco model 90 "cathedral radio" of 1931, a design icon of early radio, and the most recognised cathedral design sets

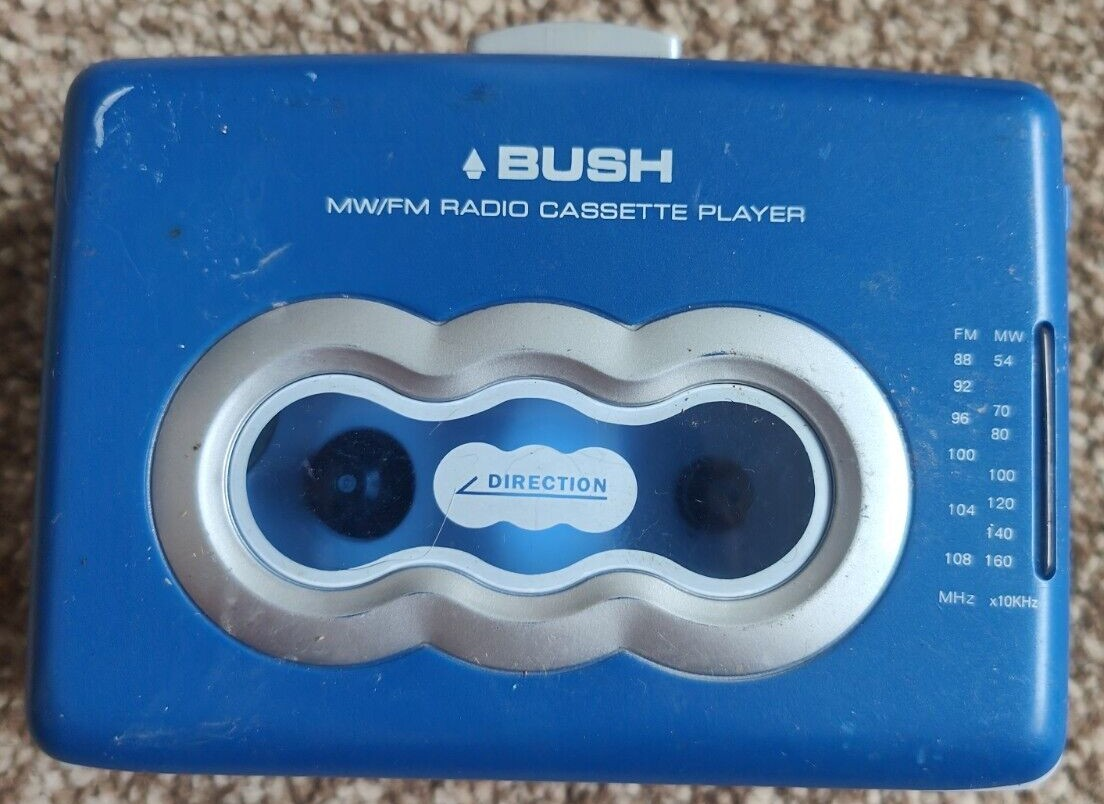
Bush personal cassette player with MW/FM

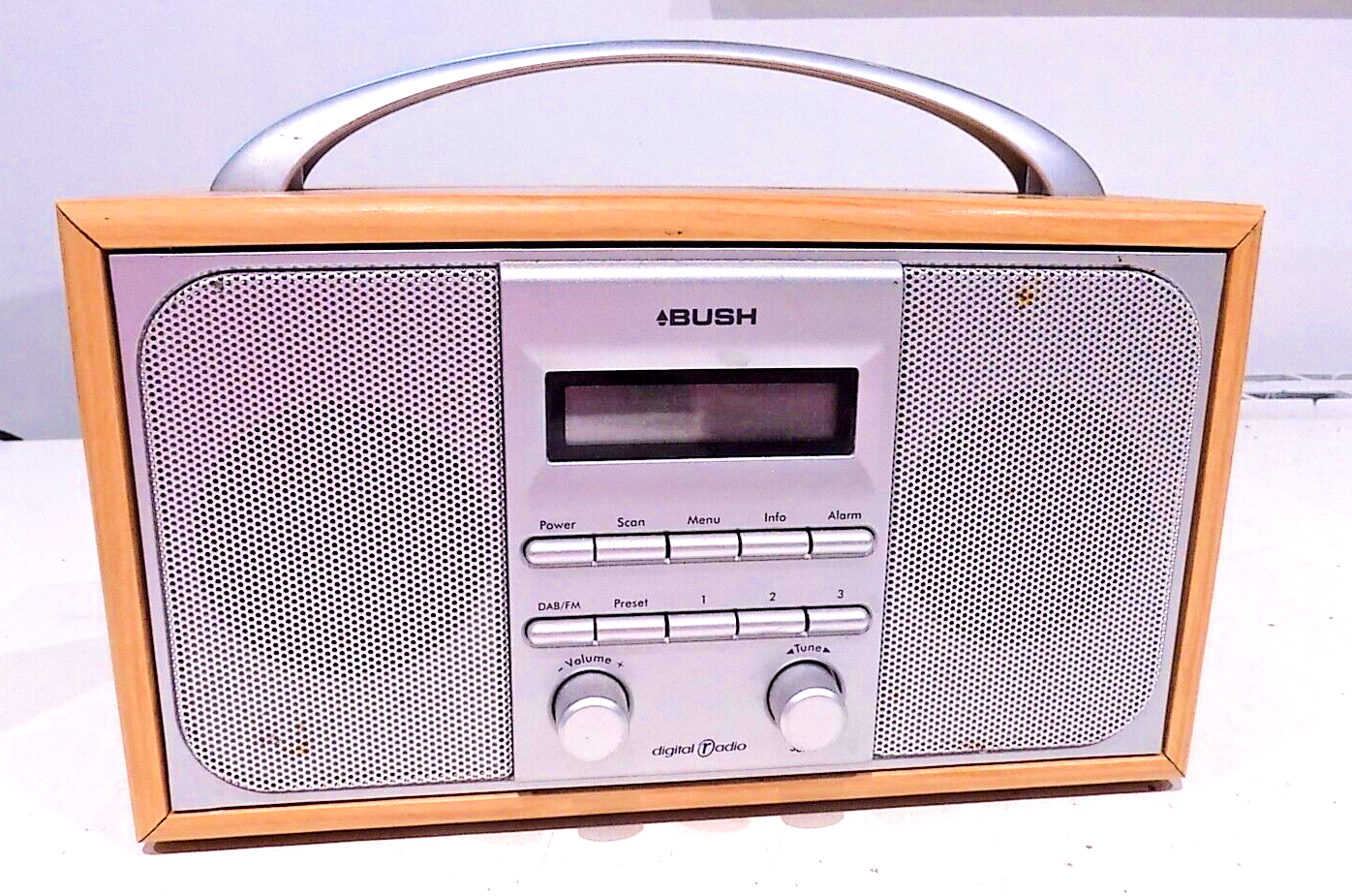
Bush 141/4798 DAB radio, designed to mimick the wooden style of the Pure Evoke

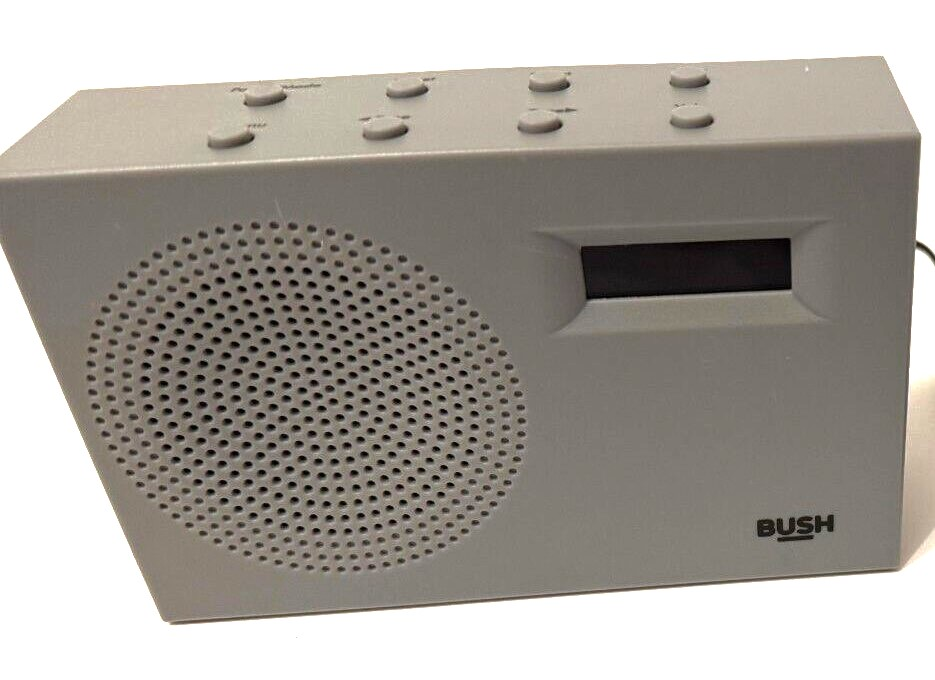
Bush BD-1709 DAB kitchen radio

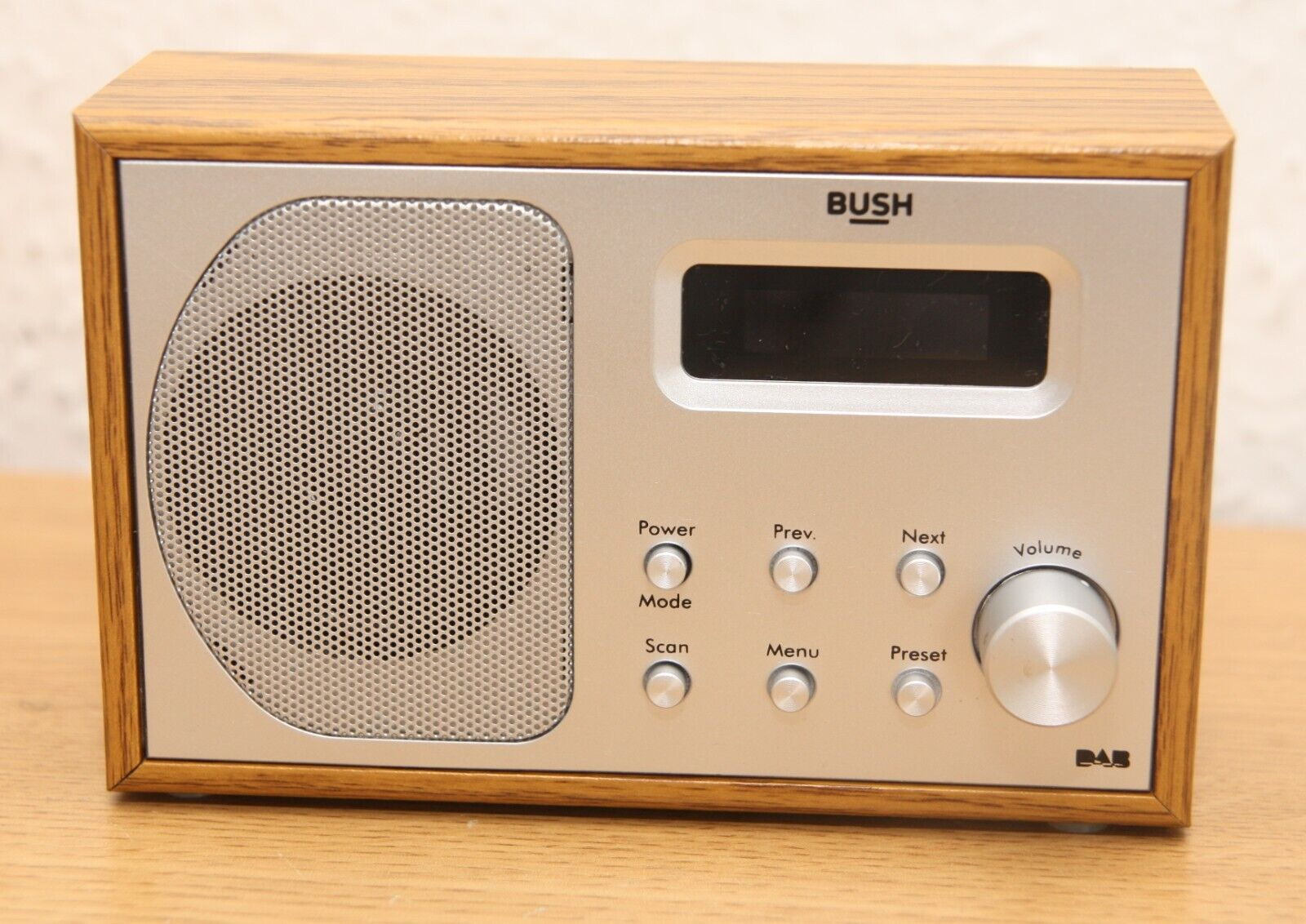
Bush BD-1207S DAB radio

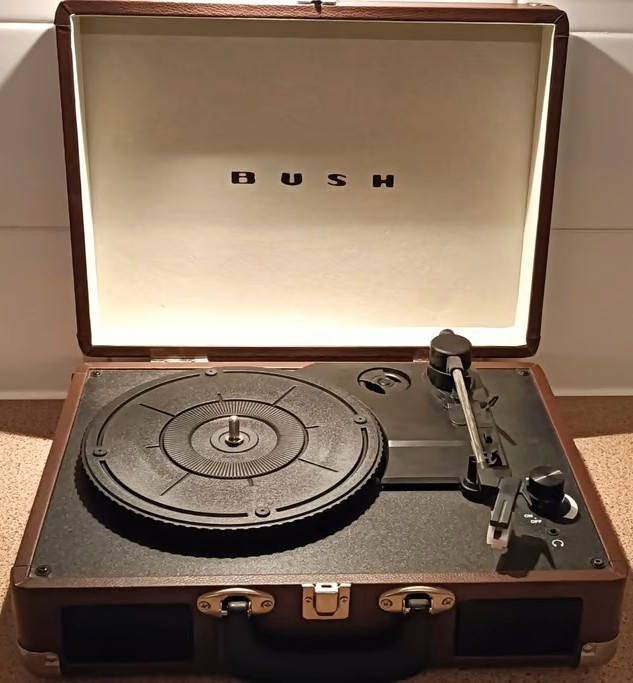
Bush Classic KTS-601 suitcase style turntable

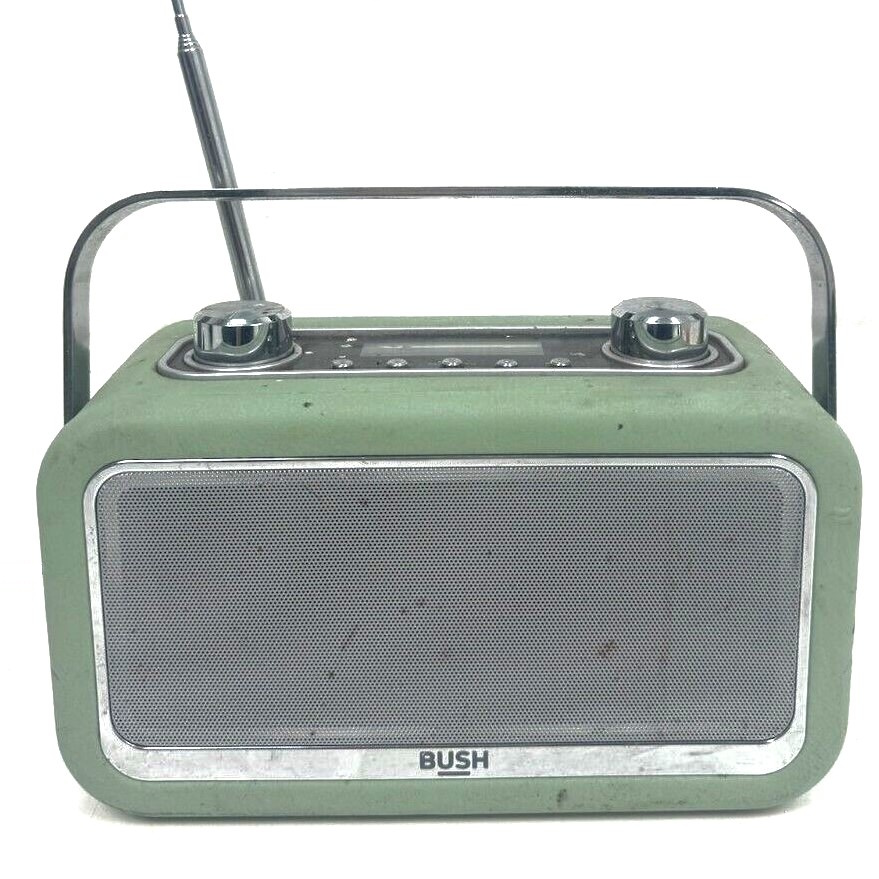
Bush Classic Leather Look retro style DAB radio

== Sources ==
- Radio and television brands Alba and Bush sold to Argos owner Home Retail Group
- Home Retail Group signs contract for Intellectual Property Rights to Bush and Alba Trademarks
- Bush Freesat Website
