= Home Retail Group =

UK home and general merchandise retailer

Home Retail Group plc
- Predecessor: Argos Retail Group (ARG)
- Founded: 10 October 2006; 19 years ago
- Defunct: 2 September 2016; 9 years ago
- Fate: Acquired by and folded into Sainsbury's
- Successor: Sainsbury's
- Brands: Alba; Bush; Chad Valley; Challenge; Cookworks; Habitat; Heart of House; Hygena; Schreiber Furniture
- Subsidiaries: Argos; Homebase (divested); Home Store + More (divested)

Home Retail Group plc was a British retail company established on 10 October 2006, following the spin-off of Argos Retail Group (ARG) from GUS plc. It was listed on the London Stock Exchange (LSE).

The group primarily comprised two retailers: Argos and Homebase, as well as in-house brands such as Chad Valley and Habitat. In April 2007, the group bought a stake in the Irish 'Home Store + More' chain and established its UK business, closing this in 2012 and selling their stake in 2013.

In February 2016. Home Retail Group sold Homebase to Australian-based Wesfarmers. In April 2016, it was announced that Home Retail Group would sell itself to British supermarket Sainsbury's for £1.4 billion.

== History ==
=== Predecessor as Argos Retail Group (2000–2006) ===
GUS plc acquired Argos in April 1998, and combined it with its mail order business to form Argos Retail Group (ARG) in June 2000. It went on to acquire Homebase for £900 million in November 2002, bringing it into ARG.

In June 2005, GUS bought thirty three stores of Index, which were subsequently converted to the format of Argos.

=== Home Retail Group (2007–2016) ===
Argos Retail Group was renamed Home Retail Group, upon its demerger in July 2006 from GUS. Shares in Home Retail Group were traded on the London Stock Exchange as from 11 October 2006.

In October 2007, Home Retail Group bought twenty seven stores from Focus DIY, and converted them to the format of Homebase. In June 2011, the group bought the exclusive rights to the brand of Habitat, its brand designs and intellectual property in the United Kingdom and Ireland, along with three stores in London and its website.

In November 2015, the group rejected a £1 billion takeover proposal from the supermarket company Sainsbury's, which it revealed on 5 January 2016. On 18 January 2016, it was confirmed that Homebase would be sold to the Australian retailer Wesfarmers for £340 million, subject to shareholder approval. The sale was completed on 27 February 2016.

=== Takeover by Sainsbury's (2016) ===
Sainsbury's submitted a revised offer of £1.3 billion on 2 February 2016, with a deadline of 23 February to make a firm bid. Steinhoff International submitted a rival bid of £1.4 billion on 19 February. Steinhoff abandoned its bid on 18 March 2016, while Sainsbury's submitted a formal bid of £1.4 billion. On 1 April 2016, the company agreed to a takeover offer from Sainsbury's. The deal was completed on 2 September 2016.

== Operations ==
Home Retail Group's businesses Argos and Habitat operated in over eight hundred stores across the United Kingdom and Ireland.

The group had a 49% holding in a multi-channel general merchandise retail business in China, called HH Retail Limited, with Haier Group, one of the world's leading home appliance manufacturers, holding the remaining 51%. The group sold its 33% shareholding in Ogalas Limited (which trades as 'home store + more' in the Republic of Ireland) on 8 March 2013.

Home Retail Group owned a number of well known brands, including Alba, Bush, Chad Valley, Habitat, Hygena, Schreiber, Challenge, Sovereign, Cookworks and Heart of House.

== Financial performance ==
All figures below are for the Group's financial years, which ran for fifty two or fifty three week periods to end of February/beginning of March.

Under the terms of the agreement with Sainsbury's to acquire Home Retail Group, for each Home Retail Group share, shareholders received 0.321 new Sainsbury’s shares and 55p per share. As a result of the sale of Homebase, they also received 25p per share, plus the year's dividend as a final dividend payment.

52/53 weeks ended	Turnover (£m)	Profit/(loss) (£m)		Basic earnings per share (p)
52/53 weeks ended	Turnover (£m)	before tax		Basic earnings per share (p)
27 February 2016	5,668.0	94.7	(808)	2.8
28 February 2015	5,710.4	93.8	71.6	9.4
1 March 2014	5,663.0	71.2	54.0	6.8
2 March 2013	5,475.4	130.1	94.0	11.7
3 March 2012	5,582.8	104.1	72.8	9.1
26 February 2011	5,851.9	265.2	190.9	23.1
27 February 2010	6,022.7	293.0	209.8	24.3
28 February 2009	5,897.4	(394.2)	(413.1)	(47.7)
1 March 2008	5,984.8	426.0	294.6	34.0
