= Hygena =

British fitted kitchen and furniture brand

- Type: Limited company
- Industry: Retailer
- Founded: 1925
- Founders: George Nunn and Len Cooklin
- Headquarters: Milton Keynes, UK
- Area served: United Kingdom
- Products: Kitchens, furniture, appliances
- Owner: J Sainsbury plc
- Website: www.argos.co.uk/hygena

Hygena is a dormant brand of fitted kitchen and furniture in the United Kingdom.

Started in Liverpool in 1925 to make Hoosier cabinets, it was bought by new investors in 1938, who after the war built modular kitchens for the new British post-war temporary prefab houses. With the introduction of design concepts based on the Frankfurt kitchen and new materials such as formica, Hygena became the dominant brand in kitchens from the 1960s through the 1970s. But mass manufacture and a change in styles meant that it ended up as an economy brand in the UK, bought out in the 1987 by the MFI. MFI sold the mainland European rights to the brand to Nobia in 2006, who on MFI's bankruptcy two years later also bought the global brand rights. However, the UK and Irish rights were bought by the Home Retail Group in 2009. Nobia sold the international rights to the brand to Groupe Fournier in 2015, who replaced it with its own SoCoo'c brand over the next 18 months. In 2016, the Home Retail Group was purchased by the UK retailer Sainsbury's, including the UK and Irish rights and the sole use of the Hygena brand.

== History ==
=== Early years ===
The Hygena Cabinet Co. Ltd was established in 1925 in Liverpool by George Nunn and Len Cooklin, to make a variety of the then popular Hoosier cabinets. As the Hoosier dwindled in popularity, so did the company's sales, resulting in the company's going bankrupt in 1938.

Bought up by new investors, it made produce for the Ministry of War during World War II. Returning to civilian production, it became involved with the design and manufacture of kitchens for post-war temporary prefab houses. The Ministry of Works had specified a set of design conformance instructions, while the majority of manufacturers were using former war-time scale facilities, which resulted in a preference for factory-based mass manufacture.

In 1943, the London-based Selection Engineering Company Ltd had appointed Hungarian emigre George Fejer as an industrial designer, who on a part-time basis helped out with their modular kitchen design. After completing construction of over 29,000 Uni-Seco prefab houses, by 1950 Fejer was looking for a new opportunity.

=== 1950s ===
Approached by Arthur Webb and George Nunn, Fejer was key in the creation the UK style of fitted kitchen, based on the principles of the Frankfurt kitchen. The design team realised that the post-War austerity period was over, and the 1950s kitchen needed to be bright, colourful and modern, influenced from contemporary American ideals of domesticity and good living. Pre-war English Rose kitchens had been the living ideal, but with wood in short supply, Aluminium became the material of choice. This promoted a clean fresh image, which helped to also announce a new beginning post-War. Worksurfaces were most often created in Formica, which available in a series of colours all with wipe-clean surfaces, reduced the amount of labour needed to prepare food. 1950s kitchens also often incorporated rounded shelves at the end of the units providing extra storage and a useful location for the bakelite radio.

With much British manufacturing production still managed through standards defined by the MoW in the form of the newly launched British Standard, the first new Hygena kitchen range of the 1950s was the BU, available in cream or cream and green. But the mid-1950s F range was the company's first fully prefabricated kitchen, combining wall units with sliding doors, built-in sinks and larders with clear plastic storage bins. But the key to the F range was the accessibility of its style at a cheap price, with the most popular of the huge colour range choice being red tops, blue doors and white draws. In 1958 the company was joined by Alan Marshall, MSIA, as Chief Designer and Kitchen Planner. (Marshall's brother was Eric Marshall, FSIA, founder of Eric Marshall Associates.) Marshall had worked with George Fejer at Fejer's design Studio at Murray Road, Wimbledon, S.W.19 in the earlier 1950s. At Fejer's suggestion, Arthur Webb and George Nunn invited Marshall to move to Liverpool to join them at their Kirkby factory, and henceforward he was largely responsible for their design and planning work. <Marshall information from family member who also knew Fejer> At this time fitted kitchens were still beyond many people's price range, and builders still did not incorporate one into their new build houses.

In 1959, Hygena was acquired by Norcros.

=== 1960s ===
However, the 1960s changed that, with Hygena and Allied Iron Foundries in their Leisure Lineline range introducing the wider use of Formica. Until this point, kitchens were either made of metal, and hence polished, or wood and hence needed to be painted. The introduction of formica meant that no longer was there a need to paint or repaint your "new" kitchen, just use it. Secondly, formica was easy clean, and although most new houses incorporated a serving hatch between kitchen and dining room, more and more families were adopting to the American kitchen diner concept.

In 1967 Norcros reorganised the board of Hygena with the appointments of Donald Standen, (MD), John Kennedy (marketing director), Derek Davies (Production Director) and George Robinson (Technical Director). These changes were made to improve production and increase sales and profitability. The company's main business was with Builders Merchants and Departmental Stores, none of whom kept items in stock. John Kennedy requested George Robinson to produce a limited range of melamine faced units at a specific price level in order to provide a USP for Hygena in the market place, and to facilitate retail stock holding. The company's TV advertising used a little girl to demonstrate simplicity of assembly, and the ease of units being carried away by customers. As a result of the introduction of QA (Quick Assembly) a range of seven units in four colours, turnover and profit increased immediately, In 1971 the same team developed and launched a range of self-assembly Fitted Bedroom Furniture under the name White Space. In 1972 it was decided to launch a range of integrated kitchen units and appliances made by Bauknecht. By 1973 Hygena had reached a 25% share of the Fitted Kitchen market, and in that financial year contributed over one third of Norcros net profit. In January 1974 John Kennedy left to take up an appointment in the USA.

=== Bought by the MFI Group ===
By the mid-1970s, Hygena had established itself as the leader in the fitted kitchen market, making itself vulnerable to attack from others, and changes in style. While the clean lines of its 1950s designs were popular post-War, the late 1970s saw the return of the bespoke country kitchen styles to the kitchen, which were unsuited to Hygena's design style and manufacture methods. In an attempt to survive, Standen considered diversifying: Marshall produced modular designs for kitchens, bedroom furniture and garden sheds, but his designs were regarded as too 'futuristic', and Norcros looked to dissolve the company and sell the Hygena name. This was purchased jointly in 1982 by MFI and Malcolm Healey's company; Humber Kitchens. MFI took full control of Hygena in 1987, buying Healey out for £200 million, it sat alongside MFI other well known household brands as the economy choice.

=== Home Retail Group acquisition ===
After MFI went into administration in 2008, the Hygena UK and Irish brand rights together with the Schreiber Kitchens brand were bought by the Home Retail Group, the owner of Argos and Homebase, in 2009 and relaunched through those chains.

=== Purchase by Sainsbury's ===
In April 2016, Home Retail Group agreed to a £1.4bn takeover by UK retailer Sainsbury's, including the UK and Irish rights and the sole use of the Hygena brand. The acquisition completed on 2 September 2016.

== Operations ==
=== Current operations ===
The Hygena brand is now owned by Sainsbury's and its products were formerly sold in the United Kingdom through Argos stores and the Argos website. As of September 2022, no products are sold by Sainsbury's or Argos under the Hygena brand, which can therefore be considered dormant in the UK.

=== Former operations ===
==== Hygena at Currys ====
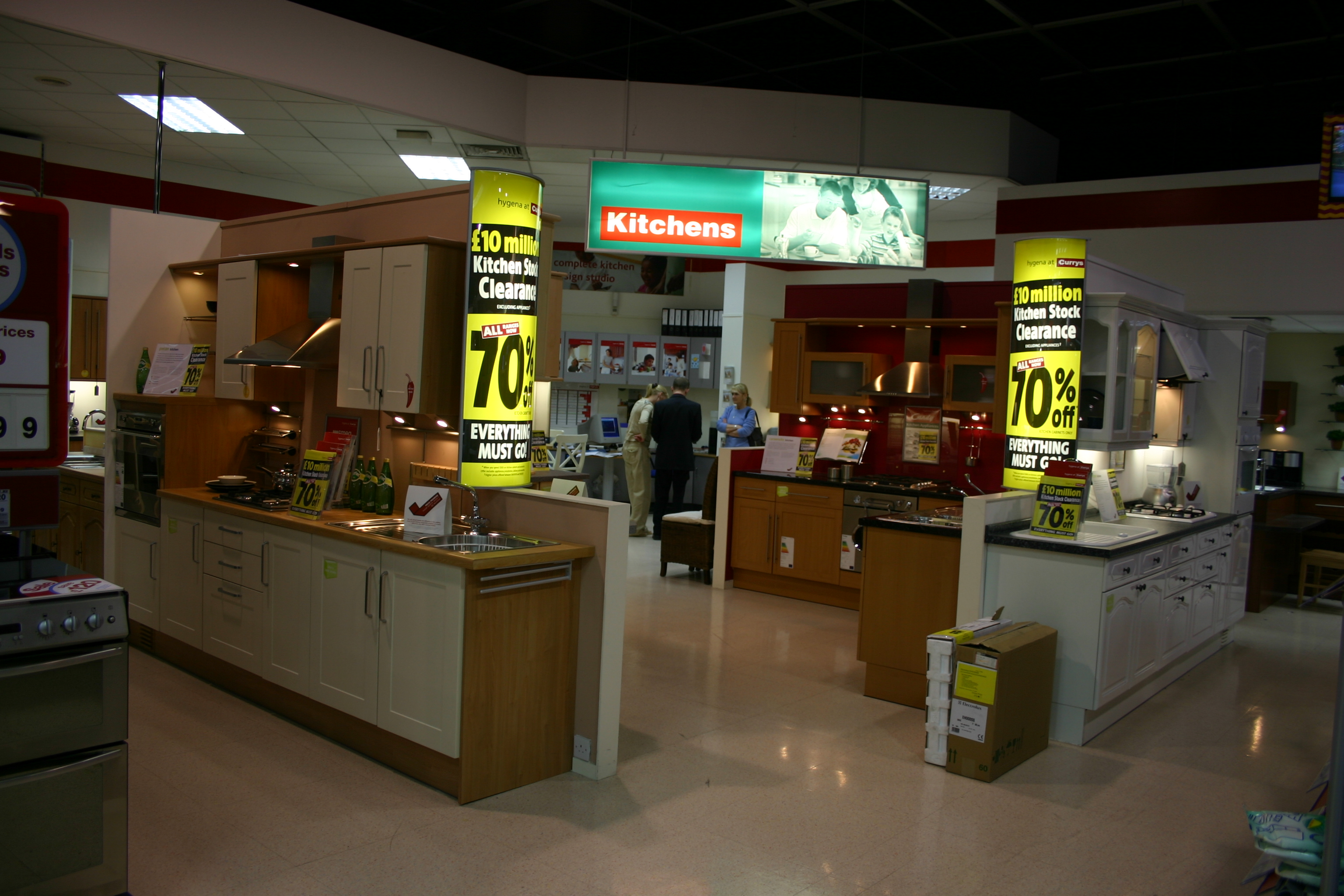
A typical Hygena at Currys concession during the closing phase

In 2000, MFI announced a concession with Currys plc, allowing the development of the sub-brand Hygena at Currys within Currys electrical retail stores.

The furniture products sold were identical to those of MFI, however rebranded to distinguish the two companies, and usually sold at a vastly discounted price to offset competition from Howden Joinery and MFI itself. Currys benefited and made profit from appliance sales associated with the sale of a kitchen, and increased product knowledge from specialist staff. There were 130+ concessions found in Currys stores throughout the UK.

But the concession suffered from particularly poor publicity, with marketing funds used entirely for MFI's own advertising and the refusal of DSG to include the brand in their own Currys campaigns. Therefore, Hygena at Currys relied almost entirely on word of mouth marketing.

On 10 May 2005 it was decided by mutual agreement to end the partnership, with the final stores closing in October 2005. Every Currys store that had previously contained 'Hygena at Currys' showroom underwent a substantial refit as part of the Kestrel Refit Programme, at the cost of MFI (rumoured in excess of £5m), to restore the floorspace to its previous state.

==== Hygena at Homebase ====
Following the 2016 sale of Homebase to Wesfarmers, all Hygena branding will be removed from both the Homebase stores and the Homebase website in mid 2017 when the agreement with Home Retail Group Expires.

==== International operations ====
In 2006, MFI sold the successful Hygena operations in France and the rest of Europe to Swedish kitchen retailer Nobia for SEK 1,255 million (EUR 135 million). The sale included the 138 wholly owned stores in its French network, the Lille headquarters of MFI's mainland European operations, and use of the Hygena brand within Europe excluding the UK.

Nobia sold the international rights to the brand to Groupe Fournier in 2015 for €20 million, who replaced it with its own SoCoo'c brand over the next 18 months. This gave Sainsbury's the sole use of the Hygena brand name.
