= Ford Granada =

Ford Granada was a name used by the Ford Motor Company for two unrelated vehicles sold in different markets:

- Ford Granada (Europe), built and marketed in Europe from 1972 to 1994
- Ford Granada (North America), built and marketed in North America from 1975 to 1982
