= Haub =

Haub is a surname. Notable people with this surname include:

- Christian W.E. Haub (born 1964), American businessman
- Donny Michael Haub (born 1990), Indonesian actor
- Elizabeth Haub (1899–1977), German heiress, philanthropist and environmentalist
- Erivan Haub (1932–2018), German businessman
- Karl-Erivan Haub (1960–2018), German-American businessman
