= Erivan K. Haub School of Business =

Coordinates: 39.9959°N 75.2362°W

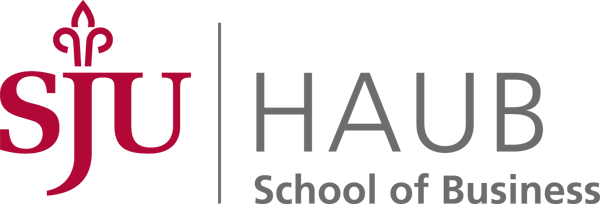
- Type: Business school
- Established: 1927
- Parent institution: Saint Joseph's University
- Dean: Dr. Joseph A. DiAngelo
- Faculty: 175 full-time
- Undergraduates: 2,260
- Postgraduates: 955
- Location: Philadelphia, Pennsylvania, USA
- Campus: Urban
- Website: SJU.edu/haub

The Erivan K. Haub School of Business is the business school of Saint Joseph's University, located in Philadelphia, Pennsylvania. Founded in 1927, the school was named in honor of noted German businessman Erivan Haub in 1988 in recognition of his long-time financial support of business programs at the university.

== Rankings ==
The Haub School of Business was recognized by Beyond Grey Pinstripes, a biennial survey of business schools, for being one of the top 100 schools in the world at integrating ethical issues into graduate business curricula in 2009 and 2010.

=== Business school ===
- 11th in the northeast, U.S. News & World Report.
- 94th in the nation, Bloomberg Businessweek.
- Among the "Best 295 Business Schools" in 2016, The Princeton Review.

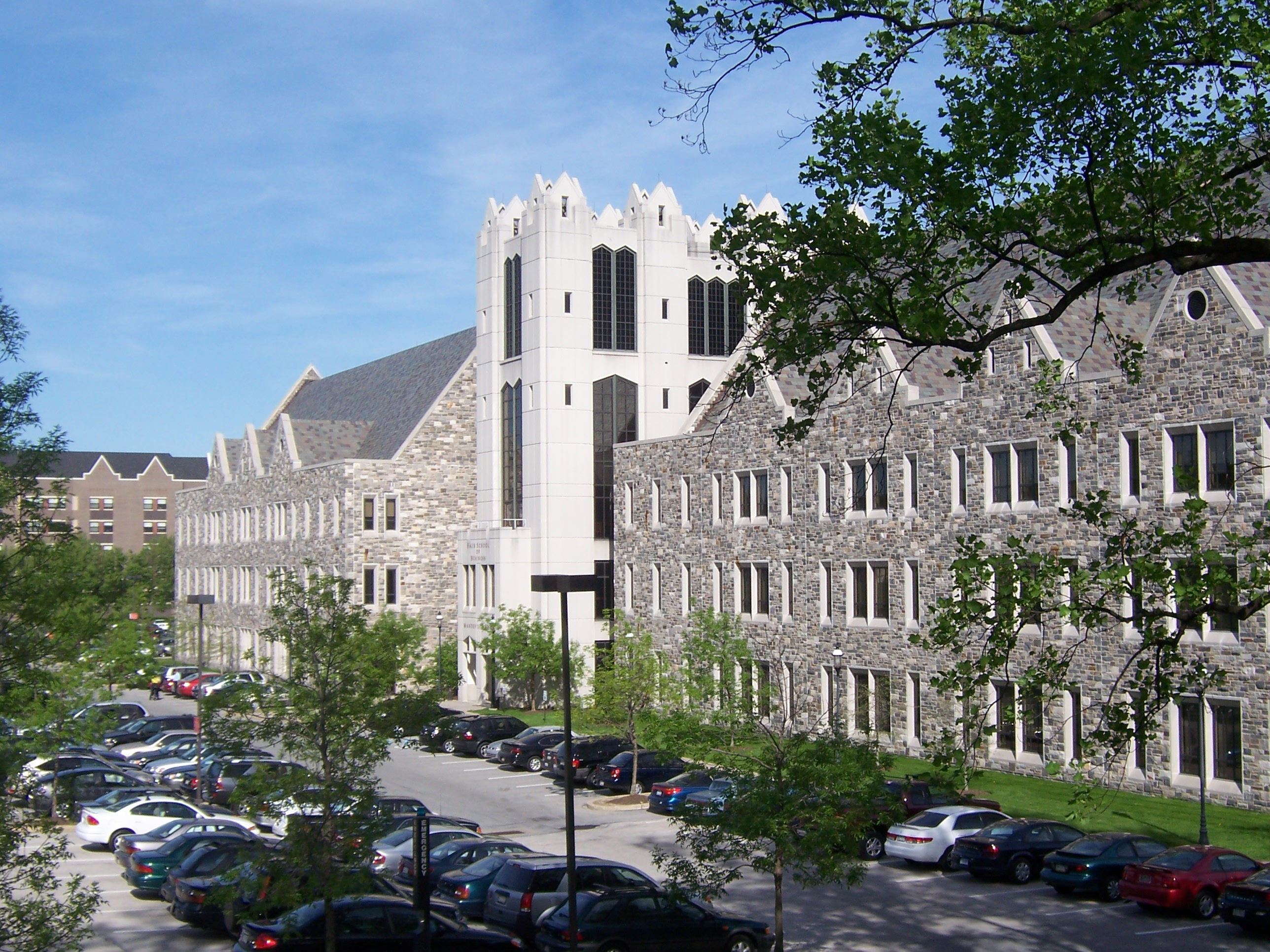
Mandeville Hall

=== Undergraduate ===
- 1st in the nation for undergraduate programs in risk management and insurance, U.S. News & World Report.
- 8th in the nation for undergraduate programs in marketing, U.S. News & World Report.
- 10th in the nation for undergraduate programs in accounting, U.S. News & World Report.

=== Graduate ===
- 1st overall in the Philadelphia region, U.S. News & World Report.
- 3rd among executive MBA programs in the United States, U.S. News & World Report.
- 14th in the nation for graduate programs in marketing, U.S. News & World Report.
- 17th in the nation for graduate programs in finance, U.S. News & World Report.
- 59th in the nation among online MBA programs, U.S. News & World Report.

=== Beta Gamma Sigma ===
From the Beta Gamma Sigma Honor Society:

- Silver Chapter Award, 2006, 2007, 2008
- Gold Chapter Award, 2010

== Mandeville Hall ==
The Haub School is based in Mandeville Hall, located on the main campus of Saint Joseph's University. Completed in 1998, the facility represented a major expansion of classrooms and laboratory facilities for business students at the university. Uniquely, Mandeville Hall hosts one of only 15 Wall Street trading rooms among all business schools in the United States. The room provides access to electronic sources of financial and investment data, analytical tools, and trading simulations. Students in certain classes must trade stocks to prepare themselves for specific careers. The centerpiece of Mandeville Hall is a 300-seat, state-of-the-art "Teletorium" (a term trademarked by SJU).

== Academics ==
In Pennsylvania, the Haub School of Business is one of only four business schools to have both its accounting program and business program accredited by the Association to Advance Collegiate Schools of Business.

=== Undergraduate programs ===
- Accounting
- Business Administration
- Business Intelligence and Analytics
- Entertainment Marketing
- Family Business and Entrepreneurship
- Finance
- Food Marketing
- International Business
- Leadership, Ethics and Organizational Sustainability
- Machine Learning for Business Applications
- Managing Human Capital
- Marketing
- Pharmaceutical & Healthcare Marketing
- Risk Management and Insurance
- Sports Marketing

=== Graduate programs ===
- M.S., Business Intelligence and Analytics
- M.S., Financial Services
- M.S., International Marketing
- M.S., Managing Human Capital
- M.B.A., Food Marketing (Executive)
- M.B.A., Pharmaceutical & Healthcare Marketing (Executive)
- Master of Business Administration
  - Accounting
  - Business Intelligence and Analytics
  - Finance
  - General M.B.A.
  - Health and Medical Services Administration
  - International Business
  - International Marketing
  - Leadership
  - Managing Human Capital
  - Marketing

=== Publishing ===
The Haub School of Business publishes the HSB Review every semester. The publication outlines the achievements and goals of the college, including ongoing research, success in business school rankings, student achievements, and new initiatives being undertaken by the school's faculty. The HSB Review is available both online and in print, and is made available to current students as well as Haub School alumni.

=== Academic Centers ===
==== Pedro Arrupe Center for Business Ethics ====
The Pedro Arrupe Center for Business Ethics is "an intellectual resource for business ethics in both academic and business contexts." It serves as a resource for the ethical conduct of business and it also serves to integrate ethics education into business disciplines.

==== Center For Consumer Research ====
The Center For Consumer Research is a center that uses research and seminars to understand the needs and concerns of consumers.

==== Academy of Risk Management and Insurance ====
The Academy of Risk Management and Insurance promotes and supports the concept of risk management and insurance education and provides services to risk management and insurance students.

== Notable alumni ==
- Daniel J. Hilferty III - President and CEO of Independence Blue Cross.

== Hall of Fame Award Recipients ==
Year	Honoree	Graduated	Title at time of Award
1990	Henry A. Quinn	1956	President, H.A. Quinn
1991	Edward F. McCauley	1961	Partner, Deloitte & Touche
1992	John P. Gallagher Jr.	1963	President, Gallagher Tire, Inc.
1993	Francis J. Erbrick	1961	Senior VP, United Parcel Service
1994	Thomas J. McParland	1956	Retired Partner, KPMG Peat Marwick
1995	Brian M. McAdams	1966	Chairman, Stratvis Private Investments
1995	Joel M. Ziff	1956	Retired Partner, Arthur Andersen & Co.
1996	William F. Leahy		Executive Lecturer, Haub School of Business Saint Joseph's University
1996	John R. Belfi	1956	Retired Partner, Arthur Andersen & Co.
1997	Thomas E. Bullock	1968	President & CEO, Ocean Spray Cranberries, Inc.
1999	James E. Ksansnak	1962	Vice Chairman, ARAMARK Corporation
2000	Michael J. Emmi		President, Systems & Computer Technology Corporation
2000	David M. Brennan	1967	President, Brennan Financial Services
2001	Michael P. McNulty	1985	Senior VP & Co-founder, VerticalNet
2001	Michael J. Hagan	1985	President, CEO & Co-founder, VerticalNet
2002	Brian C. Duperreault	1969	Chairman & CEO, ACE Limited
2003	Nicholas S. Rashford, S.J.		President, Saint Joseph's University
2004	James J. Maguire	1958	Chairman & Founder, Philadelphia Consolidated Holding Corp.
2005	Anthony A. Nichols Sr.	1967	Chairman Emeritus, Brandywine Realty Trust
2006	Joseph J. Oakes, III	1964	President, Acorn Financial Services
2007	Robert D. Falese Jr.	1969	President, Commercial and Investment Banking Commerce Bancorp
2008	Daniel J. Hilferty, III	1978	President & CEO, The AmeriHealth Family of Companies
2009	Thomas P. Nerney	MBA 1996	Chairman, President & CEO, United States Liability Insurance Group
2010	The Erivan K. Haub Family		
2010	Helga Haub		
2010	Erivan K. Haub		
2010	Karl-Erivan W. Haub		
2010	Georg R.O. Haub		
2010	Christian W.E. Haub		
2011	Gerianne Tringali DiPiano	MBA 1992	President & CEO, FemmePharma Global Healthcare, Inc.
2012	James J. Maguire Jr.	1984	Chairman & CEO, Philadelphia Insurance Company
2013	Joseph J. McLaughlin Jr.	1981	Chairman & CEO, The Haverford Trust Company
2014	A. Bruce Crawley	1967	President & Principal Owner, Millennium3Management
2015	Mike Jackson	1971	Chairman, President & CEO, AutoNation
2016	Mark A. Casale	1986	Chairman, President & CEO, Essent Group, LTD.
2017	Christopher D. Furman	1981	President & CEO, Ventura Foods
2018	Albert G. Pastino	1964	Partner, Laud Collier Capital, LLC.
2019	Adele Cirone Oliva	1987	Partner/Co-founder 1315 Capital Management, LLC.
2020	Michael A.F. Mullan, Marsha A.D. Mullan, Dr. J. Peter Seaman		
2021	Timothy J. Maguire	1988	Chairman, Karr Barth Associates
