= TEDi (retailer) =

German non-food variety store chain

TEDi GmbH & Co. KG

- Countries in Europe with TEDi store outlets
- Type: Private
- Industry: Retail
- Genre: Variety store, Discount store
- Founded: 25 September 2004; 22 years ago
- Founder: Tengelmann Group; Stefan Heinig
- Headquarters: Dortmund, North Rhine-Westphalia, Germany
- Number of locations: 3.500+ (2025)
- Area served: Europe (15 countries)
- Key people: Petar Burazin (CEO), Darius Kauthe
- Revenue: €3 billion (2024)
- Number of employees: 36.000+ (2025)
- Parent: H. H. Unternehmensgruppe Stefan Heinig
- Website: tedi.com

TEDi (formerly stylised as T€Di, an abbreviation for Top Euro Discount) is a German non-food variety store chain headquartered in Dortmund, North Rhine-Westphalia. With over 3,700 branches across 15 European countries, it is one of the leading discount retailers in the non-food segment in Europe. The company's product range includes everyday consumer goods such as household items, party supplies, do-it-yourself products, electronics, stationery, toys, and drugstore and cosmetics products, supplemented by seasonal and branded merchandise.

== Name and concept ==
The old logo from (2004–2014)

The name TEDi originally stood for Top Euro Discount, reflecting the chain's founding concept: bringing the idea of the dollar store to Germany. Just as one-dollar stores in the United States offered a wide variety of everyday products at very low fixed prices, TEDi was conceived as a discount retailer providing accessible goods at minimal cost. The old logo used the stylised name T€Di to emphasise the Euro reference, though the current branding simply uses TEDi.

== History ==
=== Foundation and early growth (2003–2010) ===
TEDi was founded by the Tengelmann Group, a major German retail conglomerate, as a spin-off of its textile discount subsidiary KiK. The first store opened in August 2003 in Hagen, Germany. The company was formally registered in the German commercial register on 25 September 2004 as TEDi GmbH & Co. KG.

Growth was rapid from the outset. The 250th store was opened in August 2005. By July 2006, TEDi had 400 locations across Germany, and its mascot — the TEDi bear — was introduced during this period. In May 2007, the 500th store was inaugurated, and the company was by this point offering apprenticeships in six different vocational training fields. As of 2008, TEDi operated over 650 stores and employed approximately 6,000 staff members.

In May 2010, a milestone was reached with the opening of the 1,000th TEDi store, located in Moordorf in East Frisia. Notably, this was the first TEDi branch constructed entirely in accordance with the European Commission's GreenBuilding Programme, significantly improving energy efficiency through better heating systems, improved insulation, and LED lighting. At the same time, the company's headquarters in Dortmund-Brackel switched to a certified green energy supply.

=== International expansion (2011–2018) ===
Having firmly established itself in Germany, TEDi began its international expansion in May 2011, opening its first store outside Germany in Graz, Austria. The following year, in June 2012, the first Slovenian store opened in Murska Sobota.

This international momentum continued steadily over subsequent years. TEDi entered Slovakia in 2013, Spain in October 2015, and Croatia in 2017. By 2015, the chain was active in five European countries with 150 branches outside Germany. In September 2018, the 2,000th TEDi store was opened in Hamburg, coinciding with TEDi's first stores in both Italy and Poland.

In October 2017, TEDi aired its first television advertising campaign, broadcasting four short films in German television alongside an online video.

On 27 December 2017, TEDi announced the acquisition of 63 German branches of the Dutch retail chain Xenos. The takeover came into effect on 27 January 2018, with the branches gradually converted to the TEDi format. All existing employment contracts were retained as part of the deal.

Also in 2016, TEDi launched a spin-off budget brand called Black.de under the slogan "Schwarzhandel für alle" ("Black market for everyone"), opening around 50 stores across Germany with plans to expand to 1,000 locations nationwide. However, just one year later the parent company announced the end of the Black.de concept, with all stores to be rebranded as TEDi branches.

=== Change of ownership (2021) ===
Up until 30 April 2021, the Tengelmann Group held a 30 percent minority stake in TEDi. On that date, Tengelmann sold its shares in TEDi — effectively exchanging them for the shares of the textile discount chain KiK — transferring full ownership to the H. H. Unternehmensgruppe, controlled by long-standing business partner Stefan Heinig.

=== Further expansion and recent developments (2022–present) ===
In 2022, TEDi entered Romania with 32 stores. The company subsequently expanded further into Portugal, France, and Belgium, reaching representation in 15 European countries and a total of 3,000 stores — the 3,000th of which was symbolically opened in Dortmund, TEDi's home city.

TEDi also launched and subsequently closed online shops on two separate occasions. An initial web shop operated from 2013 until March 2019. During the COVID-19 pandemic, a new eBay shop was opened in summer 2020, followed by an independent online shop at the end of 2020. This was closed again on 30 April 2022, with the company citing the same reasoning as before: that its core strength lies in bricks-and-mortar retail.

In December 2024, TEDi announced the acquisition of 84 stores of the German discount chain Pfennigpfeiffer, including all of its employees. On 15 April 2025, TEDi opened what was described as the world's largest TEDi store, with a retail floor space of approximately 3,000 square metres, in Flensburg, Germany.

== Business model and store concept ==
TEDi positions itself as a non-food variety store targeting everyday shoppers seeking affordable alternatives to mainstream retail. Its assortment encompasses 3,000 to 11,000 different products depending on store size and location, covering permanent lines as well as trending and seasonal items. A significant share of the permanent assortment consists of brand-name products, and roughly half of all items are sourced from European suppliers.

Stores are deliberately located to attract passing foot traffic, with a preference for shopping centres and town-centre locations in both large cities and smaller towns. Many branches are sited in proximity to other retailers from the Tengelmann Group or large retail chains.

Between 2013 and 2018, TEDi undertook a comprehensive renovation programme across its entire store network, modernising interiors with new flooring, energy-efficient LED ceiling lighting, and a revised product presentation layout.

== Countries of operation ==
As of 2024, TEDi operates in the following countries:

Country	Year of market entry
Germany	2003
Austria	2011
Slovenia	2012
Slovakia	2013
Spain	2015
Croatia	2017
Italy	2018
Poland	2018
Czech Republic	2020
Hungary	2021
Romania	2022
Portugal	2022
France	2023
Belgium	2023
Bulgaria	2023

== Sponsorship and public activities ==
TEDi has been active in football sponsorship in Germany. Since 2011, it has been a sponsor of Borussia Dortmund. During the 2017–18 football season, TEDi served as sleeve sponsor of Bundesliga club Hertha BSC, marking the company's first major football sponsorship of this scale. For the 2018–19 season TEDi was elevated to main shirt sponsor of Hertha BSC; however, this agreement was terminated early in July 2020, though a reduced cooperation was maintained.

Additionally, TEDi was the main sponsor of 3. Liga club VfL Osnabrück during the 2017–18 season, and has been a partner of VfL Bochum's Talentwerk youth football academy since the 2016–17 season.

During the 2021 German federal election campaign, TEDi donated €100,000 to the Free Democratic Party.

== Criticism ==
=== Wages and working conditions ===
In October 2011, the German trade union ver.di publicly criticised the low wages paid to TEDi employees. Reports indicated that even qualified staff holding an IHK vocational qualification were receiving gross wages of only €7 per hour. Additionally, employees have repeatedly complained of high work pressure, long working hours, and frequent unpaid overtime.

=== Product quality ===
A recurring point of criticism concerns the quality of many TEDi products, a large proportion of which are imported from China. The company has faced multiple alerts through the Rapid Exchange of Information System (now known as Safety Gate), the EU's safety notification system for dangerous products. Notable examples include a March 2009 alert relating to a three-pack of plastic doll figures that was found to contain harmful levels of phthalates. Toys and children's products have been disproportionately represented in such complaints.

== See also ==
- KiK – sibling discount retailer under the same parent group
- Action – comparable European non-food discount chain
- Woolworth GmbH – another German discount retailer formerly linked to the same ownership circle
