= HSB =

HSB may refer to:

- HSB (Sweden), a cooperative housing association
- HSB color space
- HSB Televisión, a Colombian television station
- Bremen University of Applied Sciences (German: Hochschule Bremen)
- Hang Seng Bank, a bank based in Hong Kong
- Hardly Strictly Bluegrass, a music festival in San Francisco, California, United States
- Hartford Steam Boiler Inspection and Insurance Company, an American equipment breakdown insurer
- Harz Narrow Gauge Railways (German: Harzer Schmalspurbahnen), a steam railway in Germany
- Erivan K. Haub School of Business, at Saint Joseph's University in Philadelphia, Pennsylvania, United States
- "Heart-Shaped Box", a Nirvana song
- Heaven Shall Burn, a German extreme metal band
- Helensburgh railway station, in Australia
- Helgeland Sparebank, a Norwegian bank
- Helsby railway station, in England
- Hill Street Blues, a serial police drama
- Humidity Sounder for Brazil, an instrument on the Aqua satellite
- Hunter-Schreger band, a feature of the tooth enamel in mammals
- Upper Sorbian language (ISO 639-2 language code)
- Head Start Bureau, a United States federal government agency which runs the Head Start program
- Hogslop String Band, a bluegrass string group
