= Lenningsen =

Village in Germany

Coordinates: 51.577°N 7.787°E

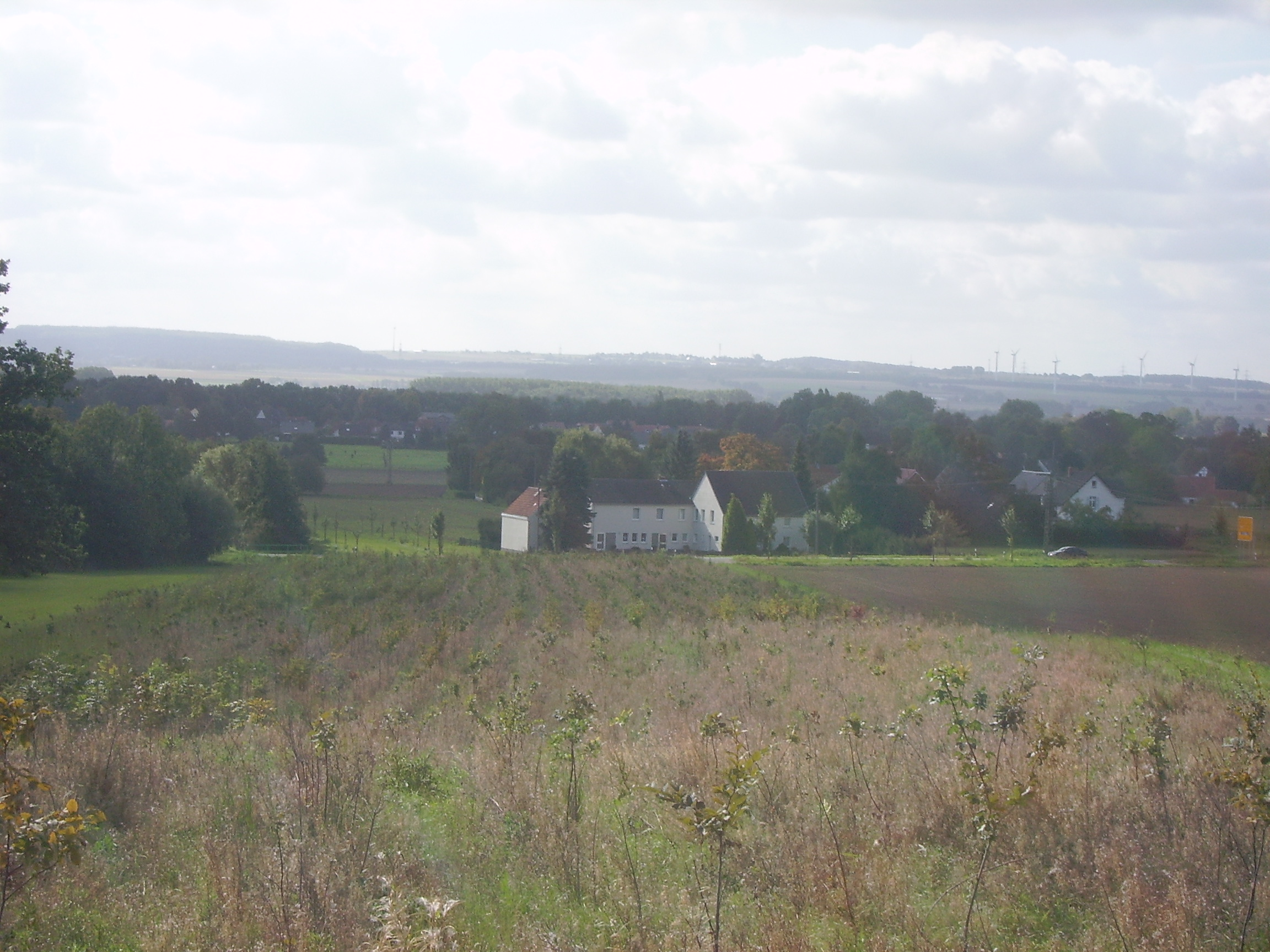
The area of Lenningsen

Lenningsen is a village in the South of Bönen and belongs to the district of Unna in North Rhine-Westphalia.

== History ==
The first document which mentioned farms in the near of Lenningsen was written down in 1486. In the financial book from the County of Mark stand names from farms, which still exist today.

In the Thirty Years' War (1618–1648) the area of Lenningsen was plundered by hostile soldiers and was hit by the plague. Many people were killed by the plague or by the fighting. Except for the aristocracy house Gut Brüggen, no buildings from that period survived.

In 1840, the first public school was established in the village. It still exist at the same place with the name Ermelingschule. In 1876, industrialization came in the form of a railroad line. The railroad line Dortmund – Welver – Soest passes through the village. In 1901, a railroad station was built which was in the World War II often a target for ally bomber because there were trains with weapons, ammunition and troops at the station area. The station was not hit but 3 civil houses were bombed out and many others were damaged.
