= Karl Schmitz-Scholl =

German businessman, merchant (1868-1933)

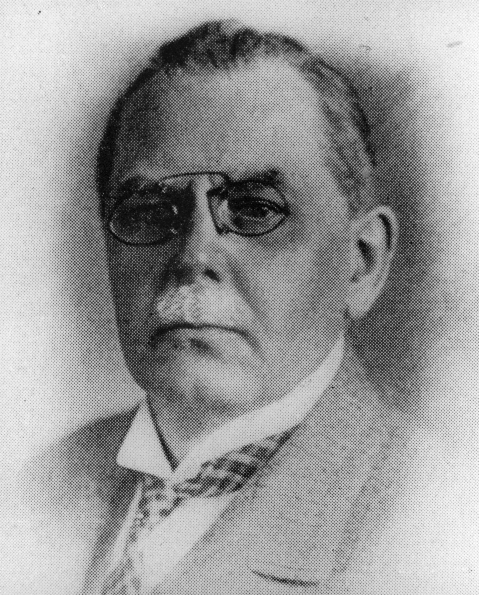
- Born: Karl Friedrich Schmitz; May 28, 1868; Mülheim, Rhine Province, German Empire
- Died: April 11, 1933 (aged 64); Mülheim, North Rhine-Westphalia, Nazi Germany
- Spouse: Elisabeth Weynen (m. 1895)
- Children: 2, including Elizabeth

Karl Friedrich Schmitz-Scholl officially Karl Friedrich Schmitz (May 21, 1868 – April 11, 1933) was a German businessman, merchant and controlling shareholder of Tengelmann, which was founded by his father Wilhelm Schmitz, in 1867.

== Early life and education ==
Karl Friedrich Schmitz was born May 21, 1868, in Mülheim an der Ruhr, Rhine Province, German Empire to Wilhelm Schmitz and his wife Louise (née Scholl). After completing his compulsory schooling to grade 12, he entered the family business, which was then known as "Fa. Wilhelm Schmitz-Scholl OHG".

== Career ==
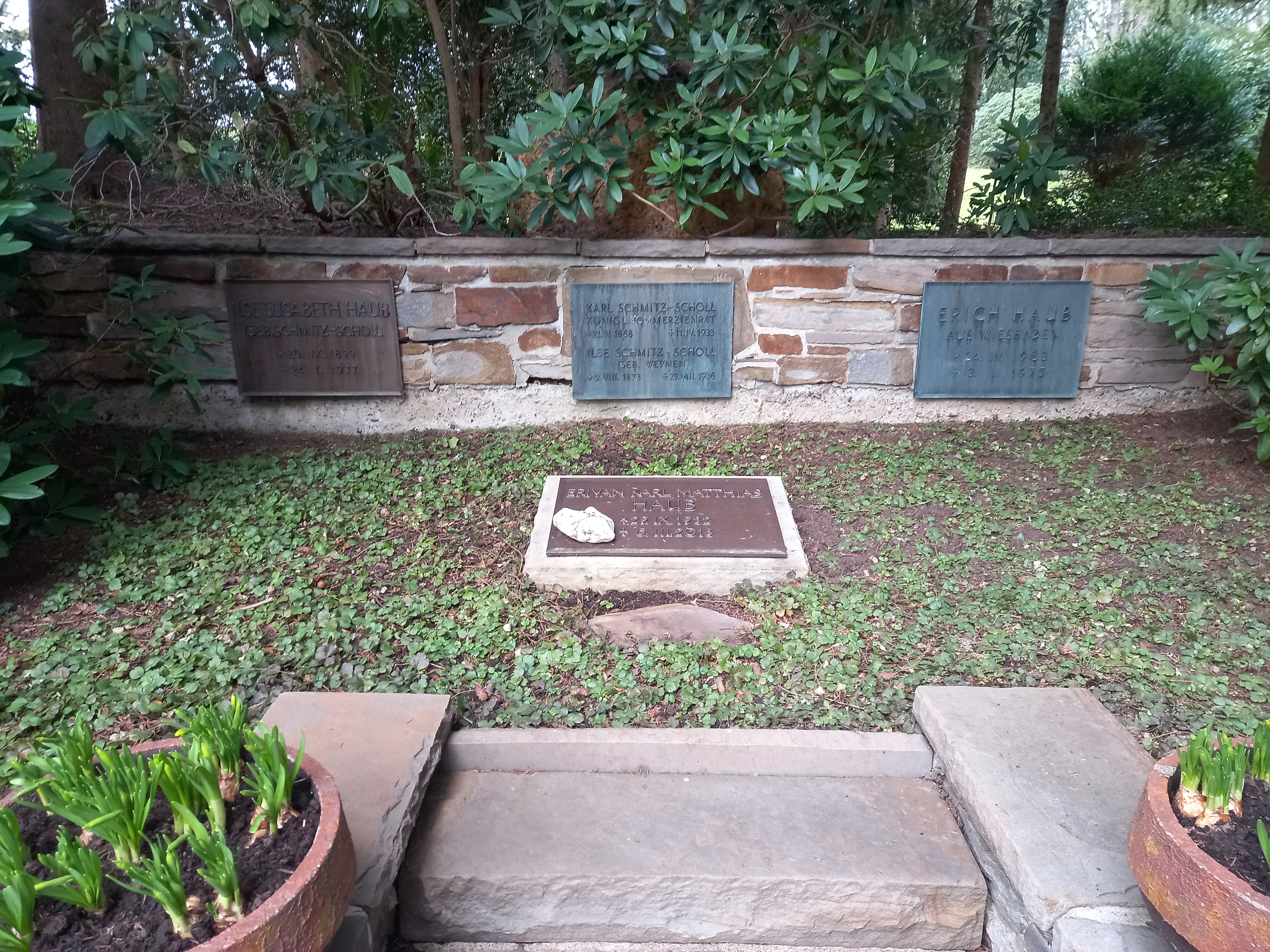
Grave of Karl Schmitz-Scholl, Mülheim

After his father passed, he became the owner of the company together with his older brother Wilhelm Schmitz (1861–1927). He opened several coffee stores and expanded rapidly to 560 branches in 1914. Tengelmann was named after general manager Emil Tengelmann. Tengelmann primarily sold coffee, tea, cocoa, spices, pastries and sweets. Following this product range, a second coffee roasting plant was opened in Heilbronn in 1900, followed by the Rheinische Zuckerfabrik (Rhenish Sugar Refinery) in Düsseldorf in 1906, and in 1912 the Wissoll chocolate factory started operations in Mülheim-Speldorf. From the 1920s, more coffee roasting plants and food manufacturing plants were set up, and the sales and branch network was optimized and expanded. After his death, his son Karl Schmitz-Scholl, Jr. became the sole managing director of the company, with his daughter Elizabeth Haub (née Schmitz-Scholl; 1899–1977) being a co-partner.

== Personal life ==
In 1895, Schmitz-Scholl married Elisabeth Franziska Josephine Maria (née Weynen; 1873–1936), having two children;

- Karl Wilhelm Erivan, Jr. (1896–1969)
- Amalie Luise "Elizabeth" (1899–1977), who married Erich Haub of Wiesbaden in 1932

They resided in Mülheim an der Ruhr.
