= Carmudi =

Online car classifieds site

- Type: Private
- Industry: Internet & automotive
- Founded: 2013
- Headquarters: Berlin, Germany
- Key people: Stefan Haubold (global MD); Fritz Simons (co-founder)
- Website: www.carmudi.com

Carmudi is an online car site that focuses on emerging markets. The portal was launched in 2013 and is owned by Rocket Internet.

== History ==
Carmudi was founded in Germany in 2013. The founding of the company was officially announced at TechCrunch Disrupt Berlin. It amalgamated Carmido (Nigeria), Ubilista (Mexico) and Motors.com (Myanmar) into one umbrella company in October 2013 although the latter is still operating under the name motors.com.mm.

In March 2014, Carmudi launched its mobile website.

In 2016, Carmudi was renamed Jumia Deals in Africa.

In 2019, Carmudi Philippines was sold to CarDekho Group of India.

== Operations ==
In October 2013, Carmudi started its operations in various parts of Asia, Africa and Latin America. By 2014, it launched ventures in Vietnam, Indonesia, Philippines, Cameroon, the United Arab Emirates, Saudi Arabia, Qatar, Sri Lanka, Ivory Coast, Rwanda, Congo, Jordan and Senegal.

Carmudi's Asian operations were the result of a €10 million investment from the German Tengelmann Group among others. As the company is part of the Rocket Internet-Ooredoo deal, its Asian operations are part of the Asia Internet Holding.

== Funding ==
In April 2014, after reporting 200% growth a month and a total of 100,000 listings around the world, Carmudi announced a $10 million funding round to expand its operations in Asia. Investors included Tengelmann Ventures, the investment arm of the German retail giant.

Carmudi announced a $25 million second round in February 2015 to gear up its operations in Mexico and several Asian countries. This round included Asia Pacific Internet Group (a joint venture between Rocket Internet and Ooredoo), Holtzbrinck Ventures, Tengelmann Ventures, as well as an undisclosed private investor.

== Mobile ==
In July 2014, Carmudi launched a mobile application which is available in the majority of the countries they operate. The app is compatible with all Android devices.

== Recognition ==
In May 2015, Carmudi Nigeria was awarded the Automobile Portal of the Year at the 2015 Beacon of ICT (BoICT) Distinguished Awards, after securing over 50,000 votes.

Carmudi Pakistan was awarded one of the top 100 startups in Pakistan at the first ‘All Pakistan Startup Expo and Awards 2015’ that took place in Islamabad in May 2015. In addition to being a top start-up winner, Carmudi was shortlisted for three award categories: Best Startup of the Year, Best Technopreneur of the Year, and Service Business of the Year Venture Funded Business of the Year.

In June 2015, Carmudi released its first white paper, "The Booming Automotive Industry in Emerging Markets", providing a detailed look into the global state of automotive sales and how car purchasing behaviors have changed due to the drastic increase of internet and mobile penetration, rising GDP, and the emergence of a middle class. This report was featured in Bloomberg, CNN and CNBC among others.
