= Von Steuben Day =

U.S. holiday, observed in mid-September

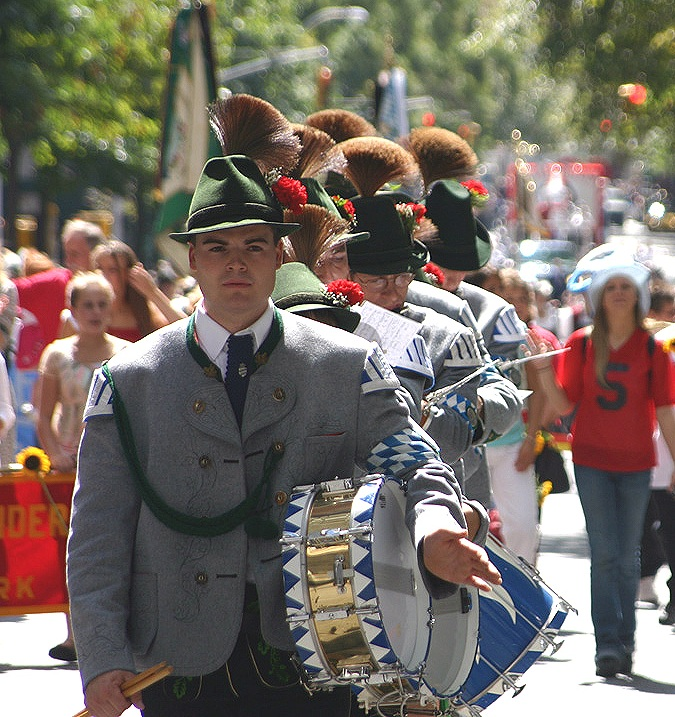
Von Steuben Day Parade

Von Steuben Day is a holiday traditionally held on a weekend in mid-September (von Steuben was born September 17), celebrating the Prussian-born Baron Friedrich von Steuben, who arrived in the United States as a volunteer offering his services to General George Washington in the American Revolutionary War. Von Steuben is still regarded as one of the most important German Americans, as his training of the young American troops made victory against the British possible. Thus, his work helped gain independence for the United States of America. The day is generally considered the German-American event of the year, and many participants wear tracht costumes, including dirndls and lederhosen, to celebrate their heritage. Celebrations focus on parades where participants march, dance, and play music.

== Parades ==
The German-American Steuben Parade is an annual parade traditionally held in cities across the United States on Von Steuben Day.

The New York City parade is held every third Saturday in September. It was founded in 1957 by immigrants from Germany who, part of the most significant self-reported immigrant ancestral group in the United States, wanted to keep the traditions of their German homeland alive.

The Philadelphia parade, founded in 1970, is usually held every fourth Saturday in September.

The Chicago parade was featured in the 1986 film Ferris Bueller's Day Off.

Many parades were canceled in 2020 due to the COVID-19 pandemic.

=== New York ===
While Steuben Day is celebrated in many cities all across the United States, the largest crowds gather in New York City. Every year on the third Saturday in September, German-Americans celebrate the Annual Steuben Parade on Fifth Avenue and an Oktoberfest-style beer fest complete with food and live music in Central Park. The parade was founded in 1957 and has grown into one of the largest celebrations of German and German-American culture in the United States. In 2007, German-Americans celebrated the 50th anniversary of this affair and welcomed former US secretary of state Henry Kissinger as grand marshal and former German chancellor Helmut Kohl as guest of honor. In 2017, the parade celebrated its 60th anniversary with grand marshals Admiral Nielson from the German Navy along with longtime parade volunteer and German-American Community Leader Heinz Buck. But three years later, the parade was canceled on the grounds of COVID-19 pandemic and was deferred to 2021.

The first Steuben Parade was held in the German neighborhood of Ridgewood Queens. In 1958, the parade moved to Yorkville, known then as Germantown, and lined up on 86th Street. Over the years, as the event grew more extensive, it drew an ever-larger number of spectators. Soon, it gained the city's recognition and marched up Fifth Avenue, turning onto 86th St, and marching across to First Avenue to cheering crowds. 86th Street was once the heart of Little Germany and was affectionately called the "German Boulevard". It hosted many German shops, Konditereis, Biergartens, Vereins, theaters, restaurants, newspapers, and dance halls.

Today, the parade still marches up Fifth Avenue but now ends only at Fifth Avenue and 86th Street. It is led by cadets representing the German Language Club of the Military Academy of West Point, which General von Steuben founded. The three-hour parade is dominated by traditional German groups, spectacular colorful floats, marching bands, clubs, and organizations from Germany, Switzerland, and Austria, as well as the US and Canada, wearing their traditional German costumes. The parade honors one or more Grand Marshals, either American citizens with a German background or German citizens with a special relationship to America.

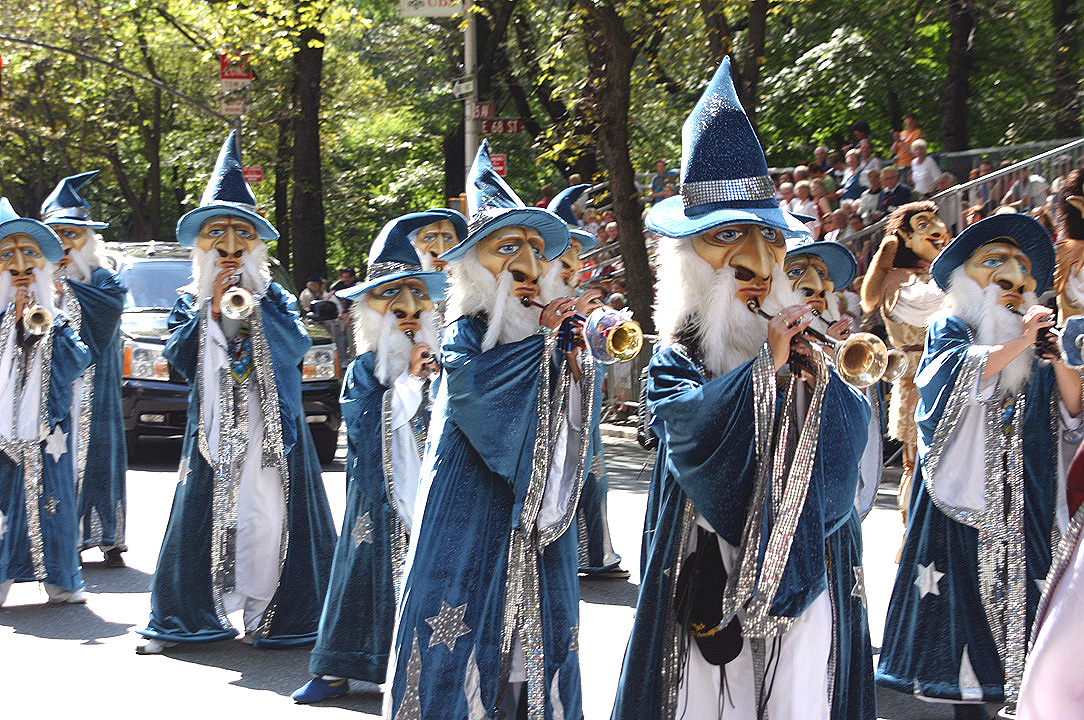
A German Guggenmusik band performs at the Steuben Parade in New York

Every year, the German-American Steuben Parade is led by cadets representing the German Language Club of the Military Academy of West Point, which General von Steuben founded. However, it is not a parade in the military tradition. The rest of the about three-hour-long parade is dominated by traditional German brass music groups and marching bands, by clubs and organizations wearing traditional German Tracht, as well as by carnival groups, sharpshooters, or representatives of other traditions. For many years, the parade has had a solid Bavarian theme, dominated by men wearing lederhosen, women in dirndl, and groups dancing the traditional Schuhplattler. Recently, though, the parade opened up to represent more German themes.

==== Grand Marshal and Guest of Honor ====
Every year, the German-American Steuben Parade is led by one or more Grand Marshals, either American citizens with a German background or German citizens with a special relationship with America.

The Grand Marshals in 2009 were Congressman Michael McMahon, Fox 5 TV reporter Linda Schmidt, A&P Chairman Christian Haub, and Parade Co-founder Ted Dengler. In previous years, Grand Marshals included Hollywood star Ralf Möller, NYSE CEO Duncan Niederauer and Col. Gail Halvorsen, the "Candy-Bomber" from the 1948–49 Berlin Airlift.

In 2007, celebrating the 50th Anniversary of the German-American Steuben Parade, the Grand Marshal was former US Secretary of State, Henry Kissinger, born in the Franconia region of Bavaria in Germany. The guest of honor was Dr. Klaus Scharioth, the German Ambassador to the United States. Also invited was former German chancellor Helmut Kohl, known to have a deep personal friendship with America.

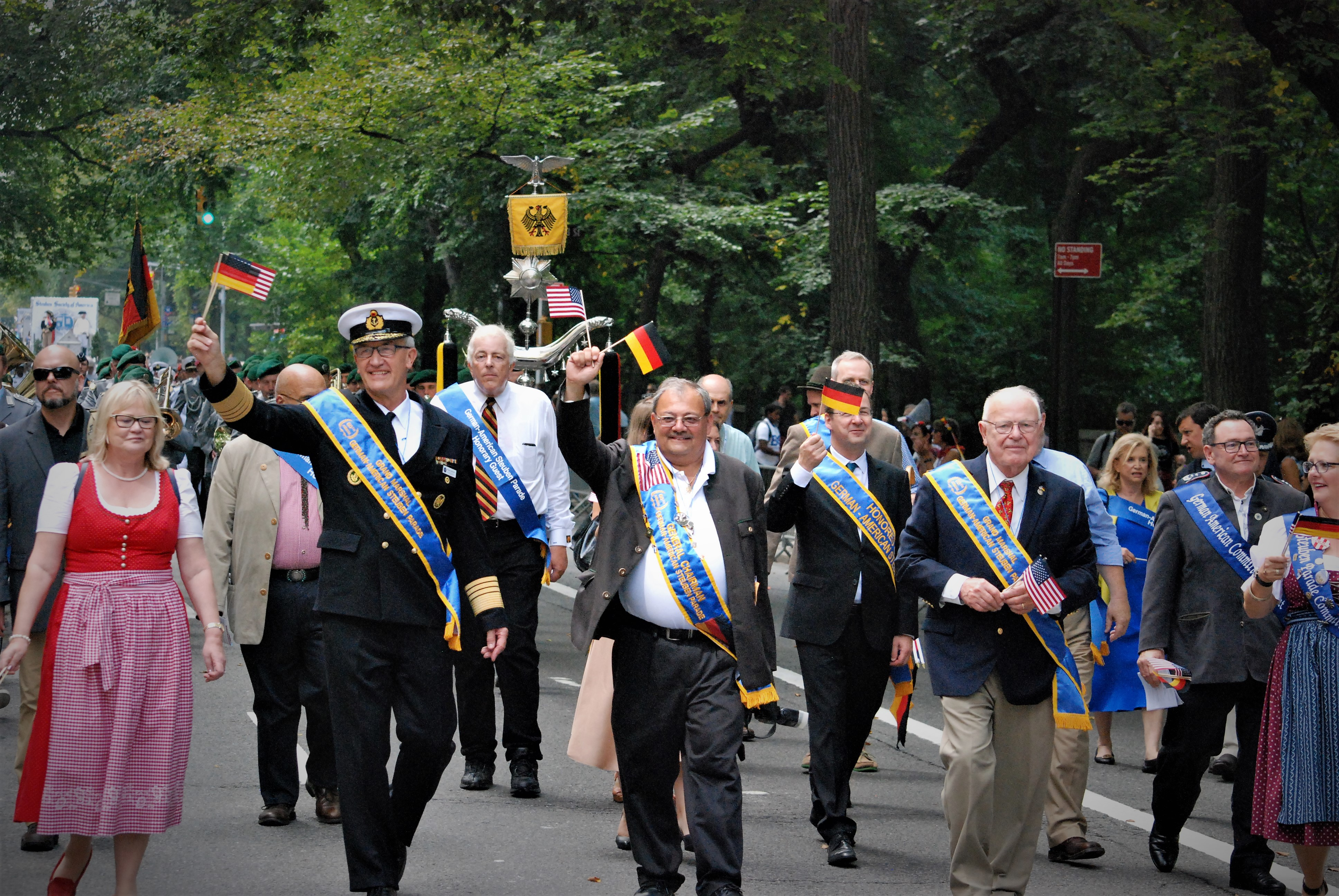
Parade VIPs: Grand Marshal Admiral Nielson of the German Navy, Parade Chairman Bob Radske, and Grand Marshal Heinz Buck, Former President of the German-American Committee of Greater New York, leading the 60th Steuben Parade

Over the years, many distinguished Germans and Americans have led the Steuben Parade. Former Grand Marshals include Donald Trump, Siegfried & Roy, George Steinbrenner, Carol Alt, Michael Bloomberg, Eric Braeden, John Roland, Louis Freeh, Norbert Schramm. Several Mayors of New York City of non-German background have also led the parade, including Rudolph Giuliani and George Pataki.

Among the guests of honor have been three German presidents: Walter Scheel, Richard von Weizsäcker and Johannes Rau, as well as other dignitaries from the political and economic fields, including state prime ministers Erwin Teufel, Kurt Biedenkopf and Bernhard Vogel.

==== Parade events ====
While the German-American Steuben Parade is held on the third Saturday in September, starting at noon, other weekend festivities exist. Usually, up to 35 music and costume groups from overseas are greeted at City Hall Park on the Friday preceding the parade. On the eve of the parade, a gala benefit banquet takes place as a fundraiser for the parade.

The parade leads to the German-American Friendship Party in Central Park. This is the most significant beer fest in New York, featuring many German brands on tap, as well as traditional German food such as bratwurst.

==== Miss German-America ====
Each May, the German-American Steuben Parade Committee crowns a Miss German-America, who serves as Queen of the Steuben Day Parade in September. She is selected based on her German-American heritage and knowledge of German culture. She is expected to promote the parade, its events, and numerous German festivals throughout the New York region each summer. Past winners include: Nicole Radske (2006), Christina Rom (2007), Melissa Gratzl (2008), Virginia Kovak (2009), Stephanie Russell-Kraft (2010), Denise Manukian (2011), Kirsten Mueller (2012), Kristina Kren (2013) Stefanie Kraker (2014) and Samantha Hart (2015).

==== Logo ====
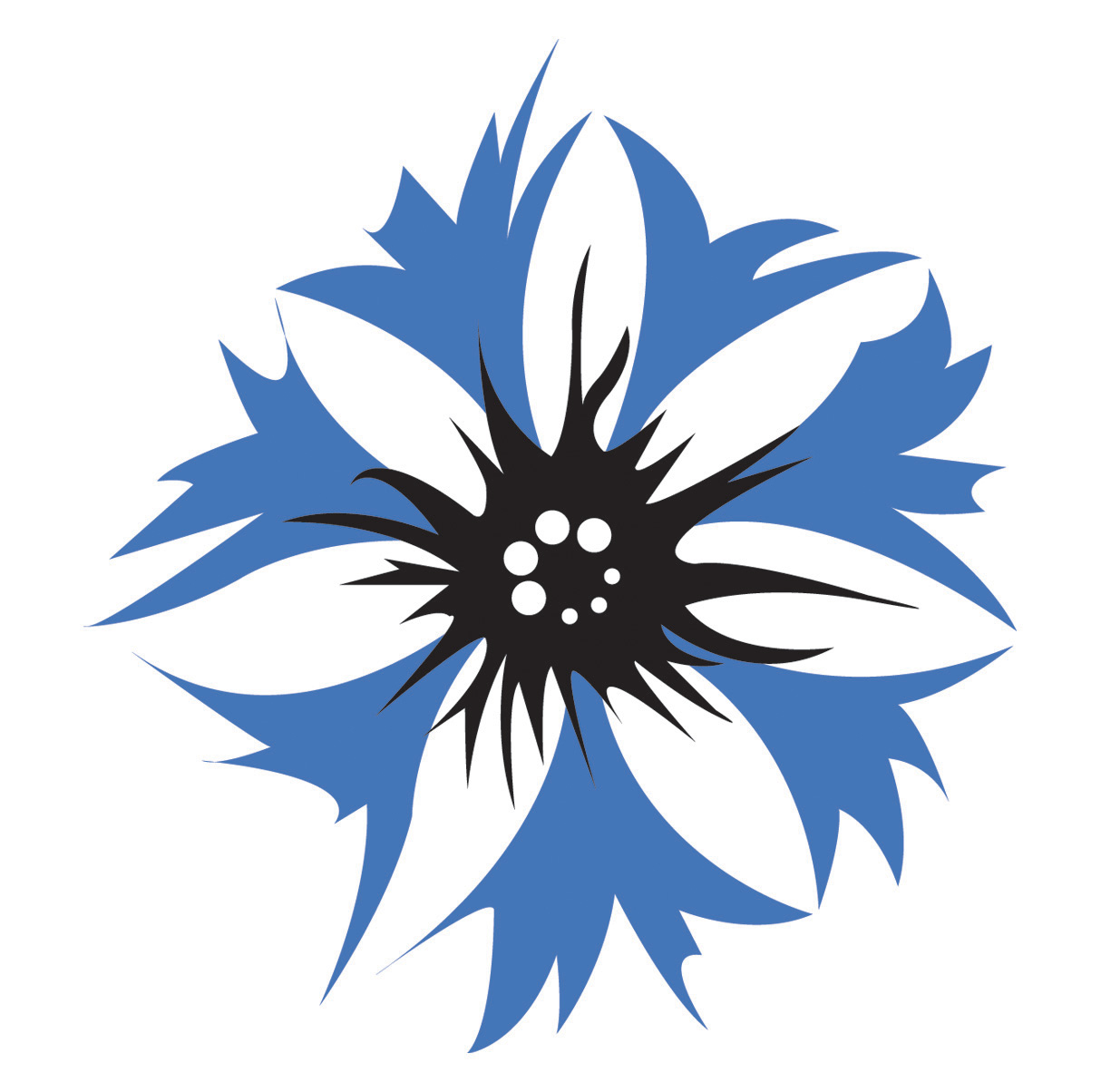
The cornflower is the official flower and logo of the German-American Steuben Parade in New York

The cornflower is the official flower and the logo of the German-American Steuben Parade of New York City, as it widely grows in both Germany and the United States. Also, the color blue symbolizes friendship and hope. In addition, the Cornflower was the national Flower of Prussia since its introduction by Kaiser Wilhelm I to honor his mother Queen Louise of Mecklenburg-Strelitz and because of its color (prussian blue).

==== Organization ====
The German-American Steuben Parade Committee organizes the parade and all related events. Since 2014, the committee has been led by General Chairman Bob Radske. The two Vice Chairwomen are Nicole Miskiewicz and Melissa Alke-Sparnroft. The committee membership consists of representatives of many German-American organizations from the New York metropolitan area, some involved in founding the parade in 1957. The Steuben Parade is overseen by the German-American Committee of Greater New York, a not-for-profit organization registered in New York with 501(c)3 status.

=== Philadelphia ===
To celebrate the accomplishments of Baron von Steuben, the Philadelphia Von Steuben Day Parade is 50 miles from Valley Forge, where Steuben trained the Revolutionary Army. Philadelphia is where the Continental Congress met to sign the Declaration of Independence. It was also home to Benjamin Franklin, sent to France by the Continental Congress. It was during this trip that Franklin was introduced to von Steuben.

In addition, in 1683, William Penn invited the thirteen German families from Krefeld to join his "Grand Experiment". They eventually settled and founded Germantown, now a section of Philadelphia. In 1983, a parade celebrated the 300th anniversary of the founding of Germantown. At that time, a group from Krefeld brought the Tri-Centennial Bike, a thirteen-seat bicycle that has become a feature of our annual parade.

==== Parade events ====
While the German–American Steuben Parade is held on the fourth Saturday in September, starting at noon, other weekend festivities exist. On the eve of the parade, a gala benefit banquet is held at the Cannstatter Volksfest Verein.

On Parade day itself, the day begins with an Ecumenical Service at 10:00 am. After the parade, participants are welcome to join the Oktoberfest held by the Bavarian Volksfest Verein on the grounds of the United German-Hungarian Club.

==== Organization ====
The Steuben Day Observance Association of Philadelphia and Vicinity organize the parade and all related events. The association is led by General Chairman Thomas Markow and two Vice Chairmen, Werner Fricker and James Schwartz. The association's membership consists of representatives of many German-American organizations from the Philadelphia metropolitan area. The Steuben Day Observance Association of Philadelphia and Vicinity is a not-for-profit organization registered in Pennsylvania with 501(c)3 status.

== In popular culture ==
The Chicago parade was in the 1986 John Hughes movie Ferris Bueller's Day Off, even though other movie details indicate that the film takes place near the end of the school year, not in September or on a Saturday.

David Cross depicted Baron von Steuben in "Philadelphia", a 2014 episode of Drunk History, as retold by Nick Rutherford.

== See also ==
- German-American Day
- Oktoberfest
- Casimir Pulaski Day
