= German-American Day =

October observance in the USA

- Observed by: German-Americans
- Type: Cultural
- Date: October 6
- Next time: October 6, 2027
- Duration: 2 days
- Frequency: Annual

German-American Day (German: Deutsch-Amerikanischer Tag) is a holiday in the United States, observed annually on October 6 under Pub. L. 100–104, 101 Stat. 721. It celebrates German-American heritage and commemorates the founding of Germantown, Pennsylvania (now part of Philadelphia), in 1683.

== History ==
Though the founding of Germantown on October 6, 1683, was to provide the date for German-American Day, most of the first thirteen Quaker and Mennonite families in Germantown were religious refugees of Dutch origin rather than Germans and until 1710 Germantown remained predominantly Dutch. The town was nevertheless named Germantown due to the influence of Francis Daniel Pastorius, a German leader of the earliest settlers. He later aligned himself with a group of fifty-four German families who had accompanied Johan Printz to the Swedish settlement on the Delaware several years earlier and had resettled themselves. These families subsequently founded Germantown, Pennsylvania, which, due to greater numbers, would subsequently be dominated by Germans within a generation, thanks in part to the efforts of Caspar Wistar.

== Observances ==
In 1983, President Ronald Reagan proclaimed October 6 as German-American Day to commemorate the 300th anniversary of the founding of Germantown, Pennsylvania, and to celebrate German culture in the United States. On August 6, 1987, Congress approved S.J. Resolution 108, designating October 6, 1987, as German-American Day. It became Pub. L. 100–104, 101 Stat. 721 when President Reagan signed it on August 18. A proclamation (#5719) to this effect was issued on October 2, 1987, by President Reagan in a formal ceremony in the White House Rose Garden, at which time the President called on Americans to observe the day with appropriate ceremonies and activities.

Presidents since then have continued to make proclamations to observe German-American Day.

== See also ==
- Von Steuben Day and Steuben Parade
- Oktoberfest celebrations
- German-American Heritage Foundation of the USA
