= OBI (retail chain) =

German multinational home improvement retail chain

OBI Group Holding SE & Co. KGaA

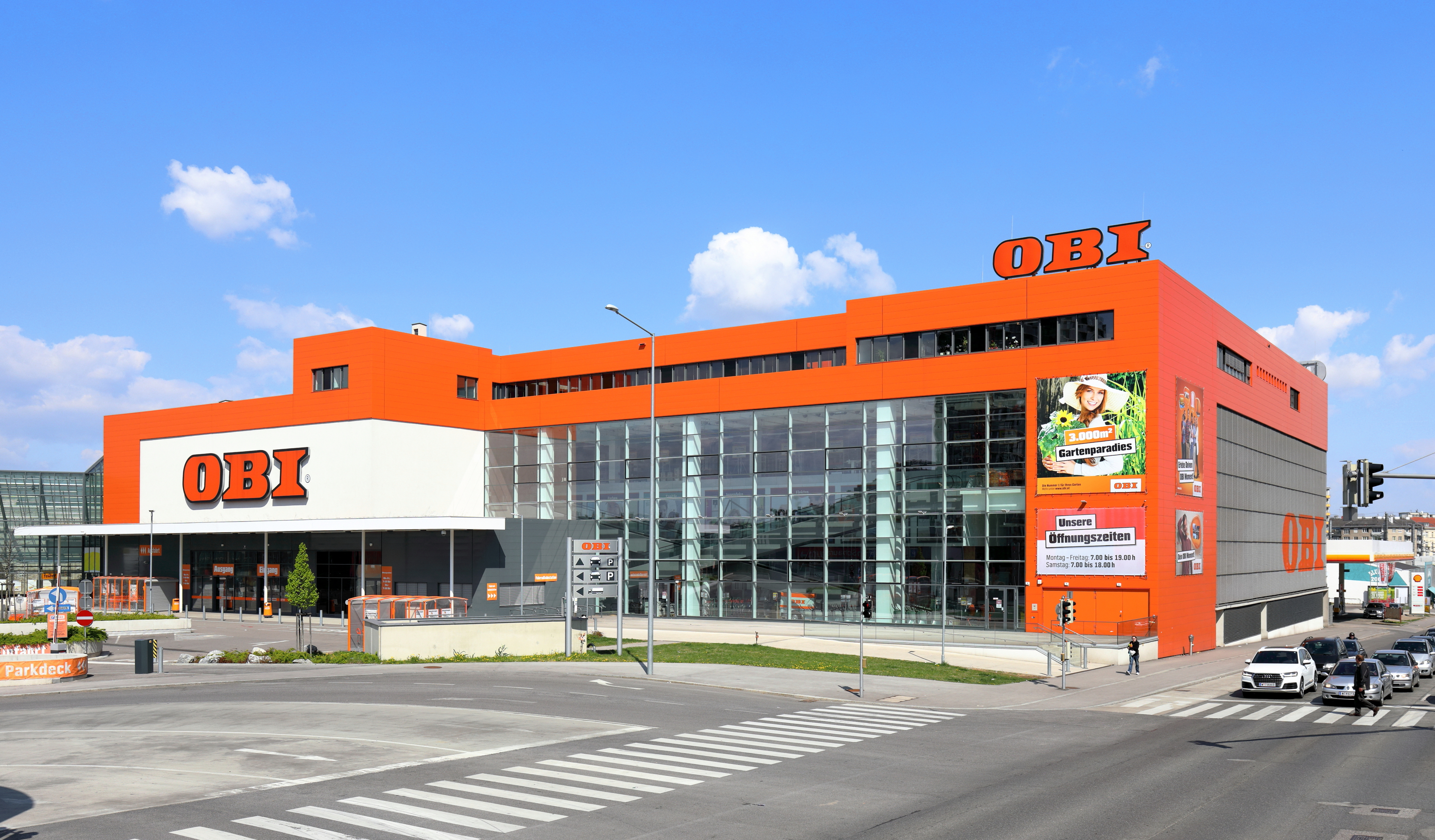
- An OBI store in Vienna, Austria
- Type: Private
- Industry: Retail
- Founded: November 5, 1970; 56 years ago
- Founders: Emil Lux; Manfred Maus; Klaus Birker
- Headquarters: Wermelskirchen, Germany
- Number of locations: 660+ (2026)
- Areas served: Austria, Bosnia and Herzegovina, Czech Republic, Germany, Hungary, Italy, Poland, Slovakia, Slovenia and Switzerland
- Key people: Miguel Müllenbach (CFO); Jochen Ludwig (CCO)
- Products: Home improvement and gardening products
- Revenue: €8.2 billion (2025)
- Number of employees: c. 40,000 (2025)
- Parent: Tengelmann Group (majority owner)
- Website: www.obi.de

OBI Group Holding SE & Co. KGaA, trading as OBI, is a German multinational home improvement retail chain headquartered in Wermelskirchen, North Rhine-Westphalia. The company operates a network of company-owned and franchised stores across Europe and is majority-owned by the Tengelmann Group.

As of 2026, OBI operates more than 660 stores in ten European countries, including more than 350 in Germany.

== History ==
=== Foundation and early expansion ===
OBI was founded by Emil Lux, Manfred Maus and Klaus Birker in 1970. Its first store opened on 5 November 1970 in the Alstertal shopping centre in Hamburg-Poppenbüttel. Covering approximately 870 m^{2} (9,400 sq ft), the store introduced a concept combining a wide range of do-it-yourself and home improvement products under one roof.

The OBI name originated from an existing French DIY store brand encountered by Manfred Maus in 1969. Derived from the French pronunciation of the word hobby, the name was acquired for use in Germany.

In 1985, the Tengelmann Group acquired a majority stake in OBI. The company relocated its headquarters from Remscheid to Wermelskirchen in 1987. In 2007, Tengelmann increased its ownership from 63% to approximately 74% by acquiring the shares held by the Lux founding family, with the remaining stake held by the Lueg Group.

=== International expansion and restructuring ===
OBI began expanding internationally in 1991 with its first store in Italy, followed by Hungary in 1994, Austria, the Czech Republic and Poland in 1995, Slovenia in 1998 and Switzerland in 1999. The chain subsequently entered Bosnia and Herzegovina and expanded further into Central and Eastern Europe.

OBI formerly operated in mainland China, where it established a network of 13 stores. In 2005, the company sold its Chinese retail operations to the British home improvement group Kingfisher plc, which operated the B&Q chain.

The company entered Romania in 2008 and expanded to seven stores by 2010. Following several years of losses, OBI withdrew from the Romanian market in July 2014, closing all seven locations. Five of the former OBI locations were subsequently converted into stores operated by the Greek retailer Jumbo.

OBI also entered Ukraine in 2008, eventually operating three stores in Kharkiv, Mariupol and Odesa. The company withdrew from the Ukrainian market in 2013.

In 2015, OBI acquired 68 stores from the financially troubled Austrian home improvement retailer Baumax. The transaction included 48 stores in Austria, 14 in Slovakia, four in the Czech Republic and two in Slovenia, significantly expanding OBI's presence in Central Europe.

Following the Russian invasion of Ukraine in February 2022, OBI suspended its operations in Russia, where it had operated 27 stores. The stores subsequently reopened under Russian ownership after the German group withdrew from the market. OBI subsequently disputed the continued use of its brand by the former Russian subsidiaries. In January 2026, the German company reiterated that it had withdrawn completely from Russia in 2022 and that the former subsidiaries had continued using its trademark without authorisation. The Russian retailer Lenta announced the acquisition of the former OBI Russian business, comprising 25 stores, and plans to rebrand the network as DOM Lenta during 2026.

In January 2025, OBI announced an agreement to take over the Swiss stores previously operated by its franchise partner Migros. The transaction transferred ten existing stores to direct OBI management from 1 April 2025 and included the addition of further locations, some converted from Migros's Do it + Garden chain. By October 2025, OBI had expanded its Swiss network to 15 stores.

== Operations ==
As of 31 December 2025, OBI operated 647 stores across ten European countries, comprising 492 company-operated stores, 132 franchised stores and 23 stores in which the company held an ownership interest.

Country	First store	Number of stores (2025)
Austria	1995	79
Bosnia and Herzegovina	2003	1
Czech Republic	1995	32
Germany	1970	343
Hungary	1994	32
Italy	1991	57
Poland	1995	61
Slovakia	2015	19
Slovenia	1998	8
Switzerland	1999	15
Total		647

In addition to its physical stores, OBI operates online retail services and the heyOBI digital platform, which provides home improvement guidance, project-planning tools and customer services. The platform was launched in Germany and Austria in 2020 and had more than ten million registered users by 2026.

== Ownership ==
The parent company of the OBI group is OBI Group Holding SE & Co. KGaA, headquartered in Wermelskirchen. OBI is majority-owned by the Tengelmann Group, which acquired its controlling stake in 1985 and increased its ownership to approximately 74% in 2007. The remaining shares are held by the Lueg Group.

The company's operations include retail and franchise management, international product sourcing and e-commerce activities. In 2024, the merger of Emil Lux GmbH & Co. KG and Euromate GmbH created OBI Group Sourcing GmbH, responsible for international procurement activities.

== Branding ==
OBI's corporate identity is characterised by its orange colour scheme and its beaver mascot. The beaver has been used in the company's advertising and branding since its early history.

In March 2026, OBI introduced an updated visual identity, including a redesigned logo. In September 2026, Germany's Federal Court of Justice upheld a decision denying OBI exclusive trademark protection for its distinctive shade of orange, ruling that the colour was not sufficiently associated with OBI alone.
