= Motors Myanmar =

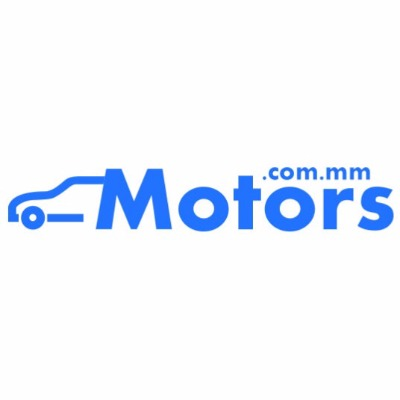
Motors-logo

Motors Myanmar is an online E-commerce platform for Automobiles and other types of vehicles. Operating in Myanmar since October 2013 to December 2017 under Carmudi, Motors Myanmar is connected to 220 showrooms within Yangon, in addition to having partnerships with over 95% of car dealerships in the city.

== History ==
The vehicle marketplace Motors was founded in 2012 in Yangon, Myanmar, to offer local buyers, sellers and car dealers an online platform to find cars, motorcycles and commercial vehicles. From July to October 2013, Carmudi launched privately in Mexico, Nigeria, Pakistan, Bangladesh, and Myanmar. The online vehicle platform had previously been available in these regions under different monikers. After Carmudi acquired Motors in October 2013, unlike with its other ventures, which changed their names to Carmudi afterwards, Motors Myanmar continued its operation under the name "motors.com.mm".

== Operations ==
In July 2014, Motors Myanmar rolled out an Android app for local users. Hosting over 10,500 vehicles, the Motors Myanmar app aims to let users buy cars while on the move.
