= Stefan Heinig =

German businessman (born 1962)

Jost-Stefan Heinig (born 1962 in Dortmund) is CEO of the major German company KiK Textilien und Non-Food GmbH from Bönen. KiK came under pressure by dumping salaries and abusing female workers in Bangladesh and other Third World countries. Heinig participates with his Dortmund Firma H. H. Holding GmbH by 65% from TEDi and with 15% an KiK. The main shareholder of KiK is the company Tengelmann International GmbH from Mülheim an der Ruhr with a stake of 83.02%.

In July 2010 Heinig together with Karl-Erivan Haub, co-owner of Tengelmann, bought the German branch of Woolworth's, insolvent Woolworth GmbH.

== Resume ==
After finishing the Realschule, Heinig served his apprenticeship as a trading assistant.
