= Christian W.E. Haub =

German businessman (born 1964)

- Born: Christian Wilhelm Erich Haub; 1964 (age 61–62); Tacoma, Washington, U.S.
- Education: Vienna University of Economics and Business Administration
- Occupations: CEO of Tengelmann Group; President & chairman, Emil Capital Partners, LLC.
- Board member of: Metro Inc. Boston College; Schulich School of Business
- Spouse: Liliane Haub
- Children: 4
- Parent(s): Erivan Haub; Helga Haub
- Relatives: Elizabeth Haub (grandmother); Karl-Erivan Haub (brother); George Haub

Christian Wilhelm Erich Haub colloquially Christian W.E. Haub (born 1964) is a German billionaire businessman.

== Career ==
Haub began his career in investment banking in 1989 with Dillion Read.

In May 1991, Haub was named vice president of development and Strategic Planning for the Great Atlantic and Pacific Tea Company. Two years later, he was elected president and chief operating officer of the company. In April 1997, he assumed the role of co-Chief Executive Officer, and was named president and CEO in May 1998.

In 2000, Haub, alongside his brother, was named co-CEO of the Tengelmann Group. Following an announcement stating that his brother had been missing and was presumed deceased, Haub was named the sole CEO of the company.

In 2011, Haub founded Emil Capital Partners, serving as the chairman and president of the group.

As of August 2021, Haub has an estimated net worth of US$2.9 billion.

Haub is a partner and CEO of Tengelmann. Haub is a director of Metro Inc., Montreal, Quebec, Canada, and was a director of the Food Marketing Institute, and director of BrightFarms as of 2015.

== Other roles ==
Haub is a member at the Boston College board of trustees, an advisory board member of the Schulich School of Business at York University in Canada and a former member of the board of trustees of St. Joseph's University in Philadelphia, Pennsylvania.

In 2009, Haub was a grand marshal at the German-American Steuben Parade in New York City, the largest celebration of German-American friendship in the US. Haub has in the past collaborated with The Children's Health Fund.

In December 2014, the Tacoma Art Museum unveiled its new Haub Family Galleries wing, following Erivan and Helga Haub's donation of $20 million and 295 pieces of Western art to the institution. The galleries have become one of the foremost collections of Western art in North America.

In 2015, Haub and his wife, Liliane, were awarded the James F. Cleary '50, H'93 Masters Award from Boston College for helping to "engage a growing network of current-student parents with BC" and spreading "the message of BC's increasing reputation for excellence".

== Personal life ==
Haub is married to Liliane; they have four children and live in Munich, Germany.
