= Unna (district) =

Coordinates: 51°35′N 7°40′E

- District
- Flag Coat of arms
- Country: Germany
- State: North Rhine-Westphalia
- Adm. region: Arnsberg
- Capital: Unna

Government
  - District admin.: Mario Löhr (SPD)

Area
  - Total: 542.62 km^{2} (209.51 sq mi)

Population (31 December 2023)
  - Total: 399,447
  - Density: 740/km^{2} (1,900/sq mi)
- Time zone: UTC+01:00 (CET)
  - Summer (DST): UTC+02:00 (CEST)
- Vehicle registration: UN, LÜN, LH
- Website: www.kreis-unna.de

The Unna (German pronunciation: [ˈʊna]) district is a Kreis (district) in central North Rhine-Westphalia, Germany. Neighboring authorities are the district of Coesfeld, the city of Hamm, the districts of Soest and Märkischer Kreis, the cities of Hagen and Dortmund, and the district of Recklinghausen.

== History ==
The area of the present district of Unna was formerly part of the County of the Mark, which later belonged to Prussia. In 1753 local government of the area was reformed, creating the first district of Hamm. During the French occupation of the Napoleonic period it was included in the Ruhr département, but once returned to the rule of Prussia, the district of Hamm was recreated, although with several changes.

In 1901 the town of Hamm itself became a separate urban authority, but the district retained the name of, and its administration continued to be located in Hamm until 1929. In that year the administration was moved to Unna, when the district name also changed to Unna to reflect the new administrative centre. Later organizational changes, the latest of which was in 1975, added the towns of Lünen, Schwerte, Selm and Werne to form the district as it is today.

== Geography ==
Geographically the district of Unna covers the area east of Dortmund, thus marking the east end of the Ruhrgebiet. Both the Ruhr and Lippe rivers flow through it.

== Coat of arms ==
The district coat of arms combines two charges relating to the Counts of the Mark, the red and white/silver checked base (referring to the fess in the counts' arms), and the red lion of Berg.

== Towns and municipalities ==
Clickable map of towns and municipalities in the district

Towns
Municipalities
1. Bergkamen
2. Fröndenberg
3. Kamen
4. Lünen
5. Schwerte
6. Selm
7. Unna
8. Werne
1. Bönen
2. Holzwickede
