= Bönen =

- Municipality
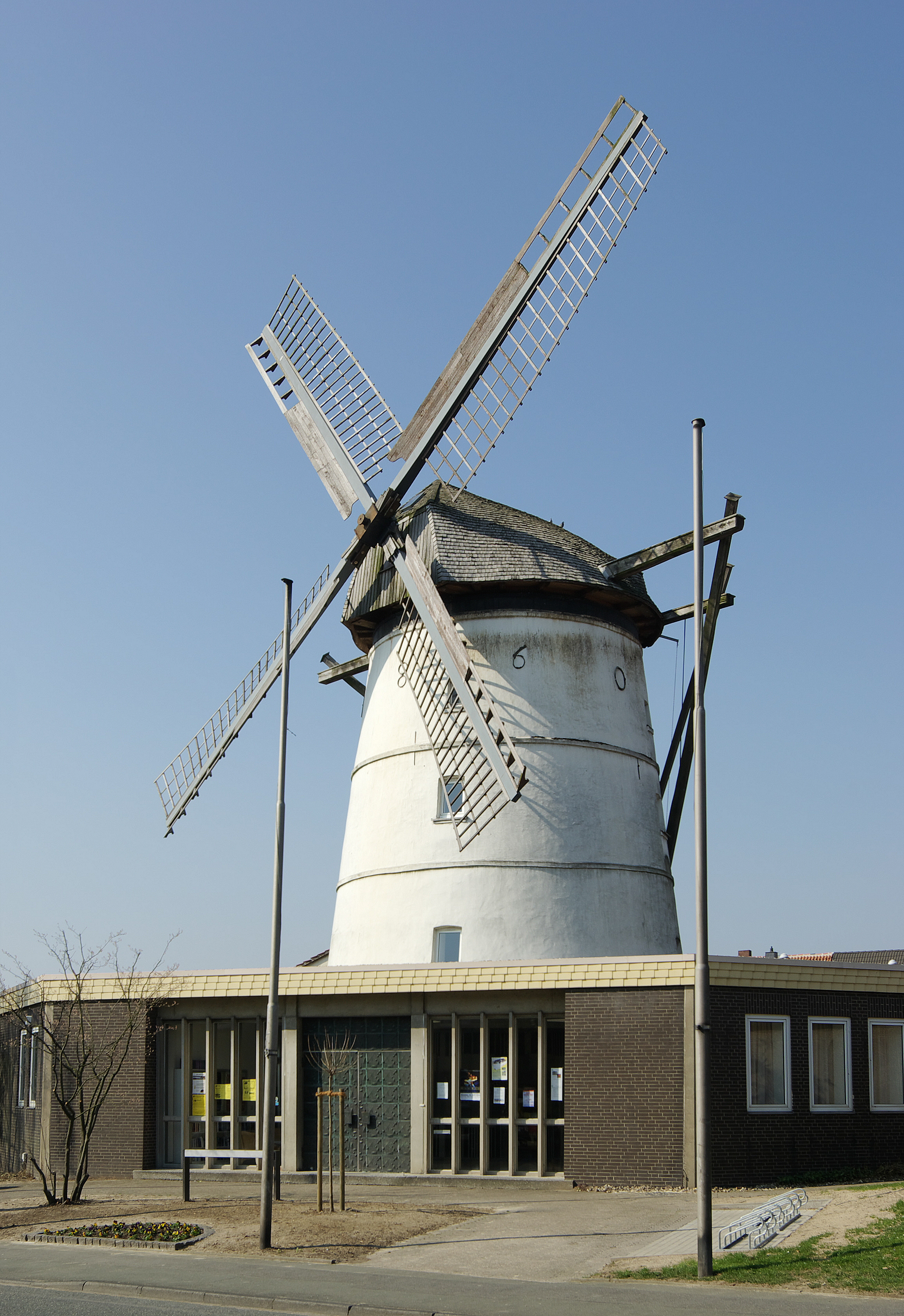
- Windmill

- Coat of arms

- Location of Bönen within Unna district
- Interactive map of Bönen
- Location within Germany Location within North Rhine-Westphalia
- Coordinates: 51°35′55″N 07°45′33″E
- Country: Germany
- State: North Rhine-Westphalia
- Admin. region: Arnsberg
- District: Unna

Government
  - Mayor (2020–25): Stephan Rotering

Area
  - Total: 38.04 km^{2} (14.69 sq mi)

Population (2025-12-31)
  - Total: 17,606
  - Density: 462.8/km^{2} (1,199/sq mi)
- Time zone: UTC+01:00 (CET)
  - Summer (DST): UTC+02:00 (CEST)
- Postal codes: 59199
- Dialling codes: 02383
- Vehicle registration: UN
- Website: www.boenen.de

Bönen (German pronunciation: [ˈbøːnən]) is a municipality in the district of Unna, in North Rhine-Westphalia, Germany. It is situated between Hamm in the north-east, Kamen in the west and Unna in the south. Bönen consists of the districts Altenbögge-Bönen, Bramey-Lenningsen, Flierich, Nordbögge, Osterbönen and Westerbönen.

== Population ==
Historical population

Year	Pop.	±% p.a.
1965	18,447	—
1970	17,671	−0.86%
1975	17,916	+0.28%
1980	18,063	+0.16%
1985	17,342	−0.81%
1990	18,391	+1.18%
1995	18,817	+0.46%

Year	Pop.	±% p.a.
2000	19,384	+0.60%
2005	19,181	−0.21%
2010	18,533	−0.68%
2015	18,059	−0.52%
2020	18,126	+0.07%
2025	17,606	−0.58%

Source: Landesdatabank Nordrhein-Westfalen

== Education ==
Bönen has two primary schools, Hellwegschule and Goetheschule, and three secondary schools, Pestalozzi-Hauptschule, Humboldt-Realschule and Marie-Curie-Gymnasium. The family friendly environment and good education offerings attract increasing numbers of young families to Bönen.

=== Pestalozzi-Hauptschule ===
The Pestalozzi-Hauptschule was founded in 1890 and received a quality certificate in 2009. The school has a partnership with Deutsche Bahn to inform children of job opportunities and support them in pursuing their careers.

=== Humboldt-Realschule ===
This school has the longest history among the schools in Bönen, as it was founded in 1840. It has a broad offering of afternoon activities like sports and music.

=== Marie-Curie-Gymnasium ===
Marie-Curie-Gymnasium was founded in 1999 and started off with two teachers and 66 pupils. 2008 this first year celebrated its Abitur. It has an excellent reputation and even attracts pupils from the neighbour cities Unna and Hamm.

== Notable people ==
- Stefan Heinig (born 1962), CEO of Kik
- Joshua Filler (born 1997), Professional Pool Player

== Gallery ==
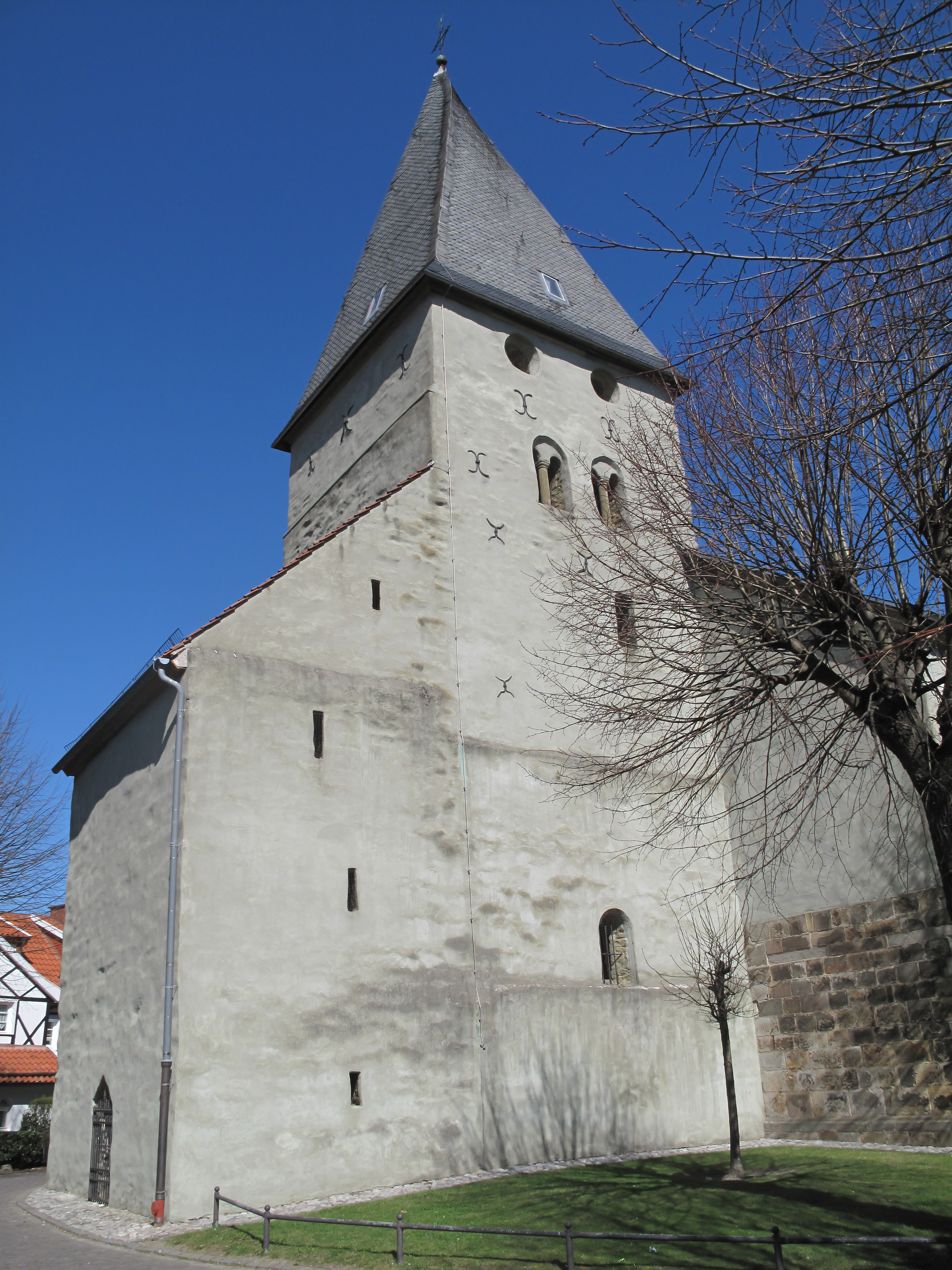
Church: die Alte Kirche

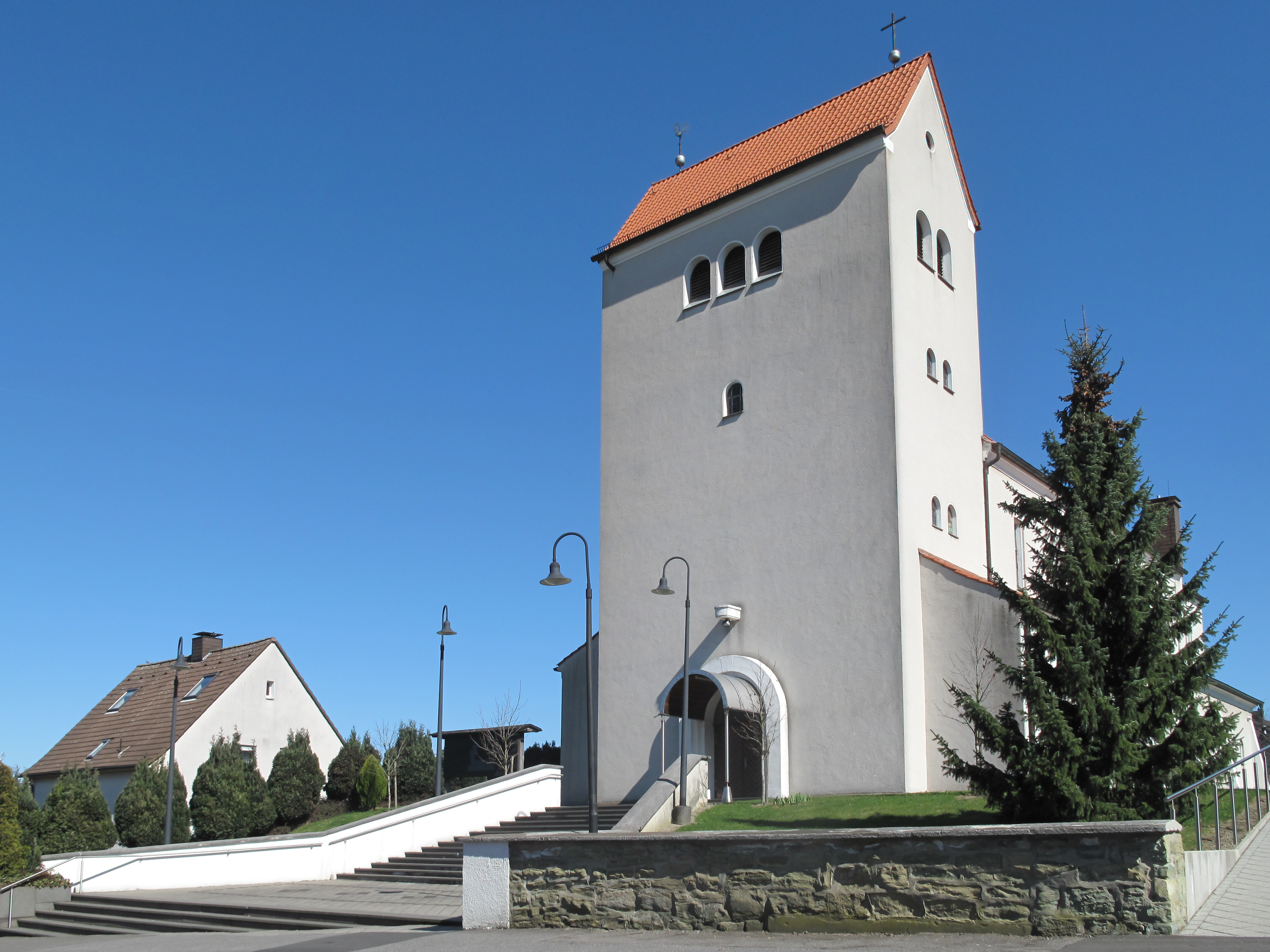
Church: die Christ König Kirche

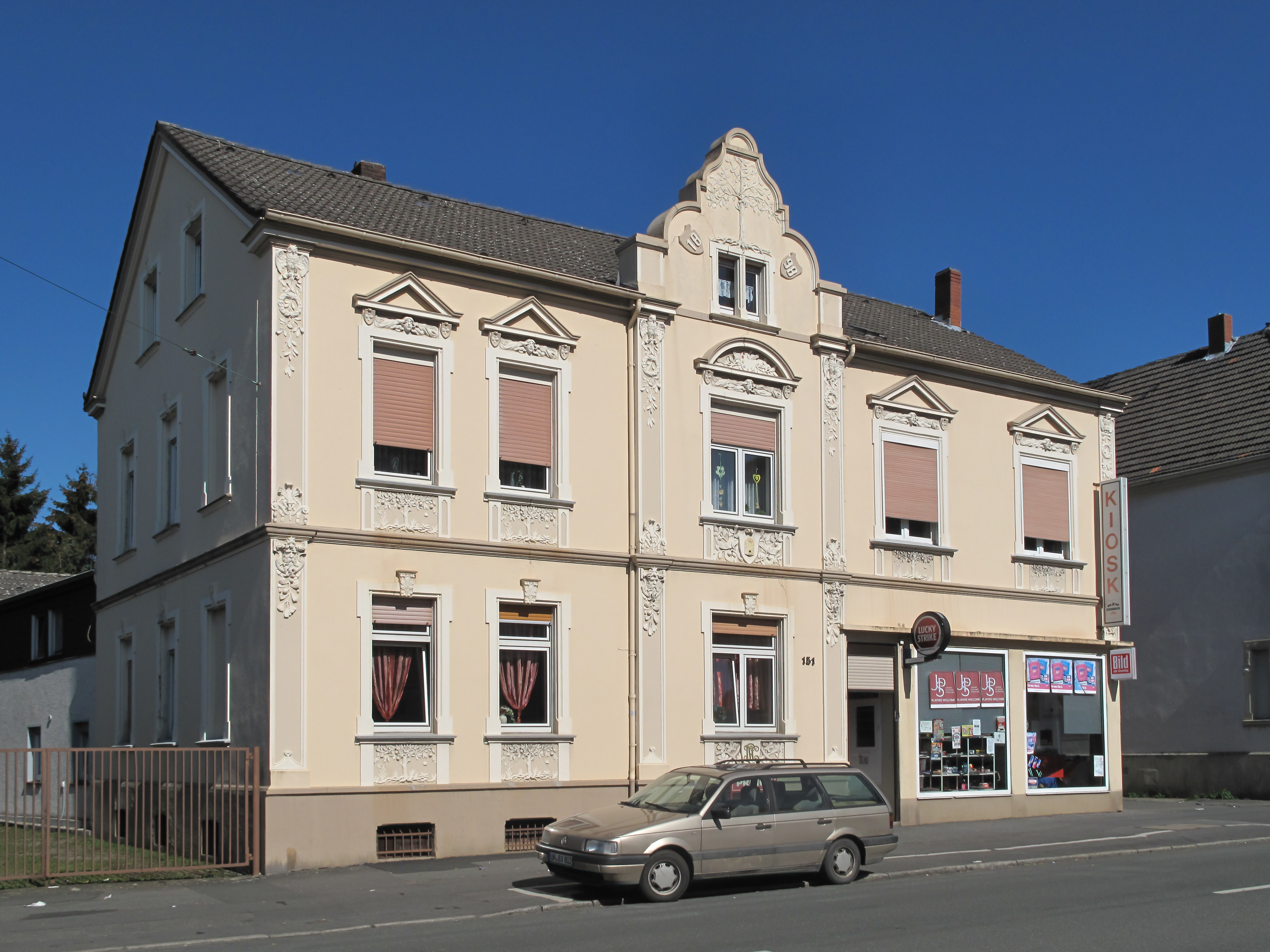
Monumental house: Bahnhofstrasse 151

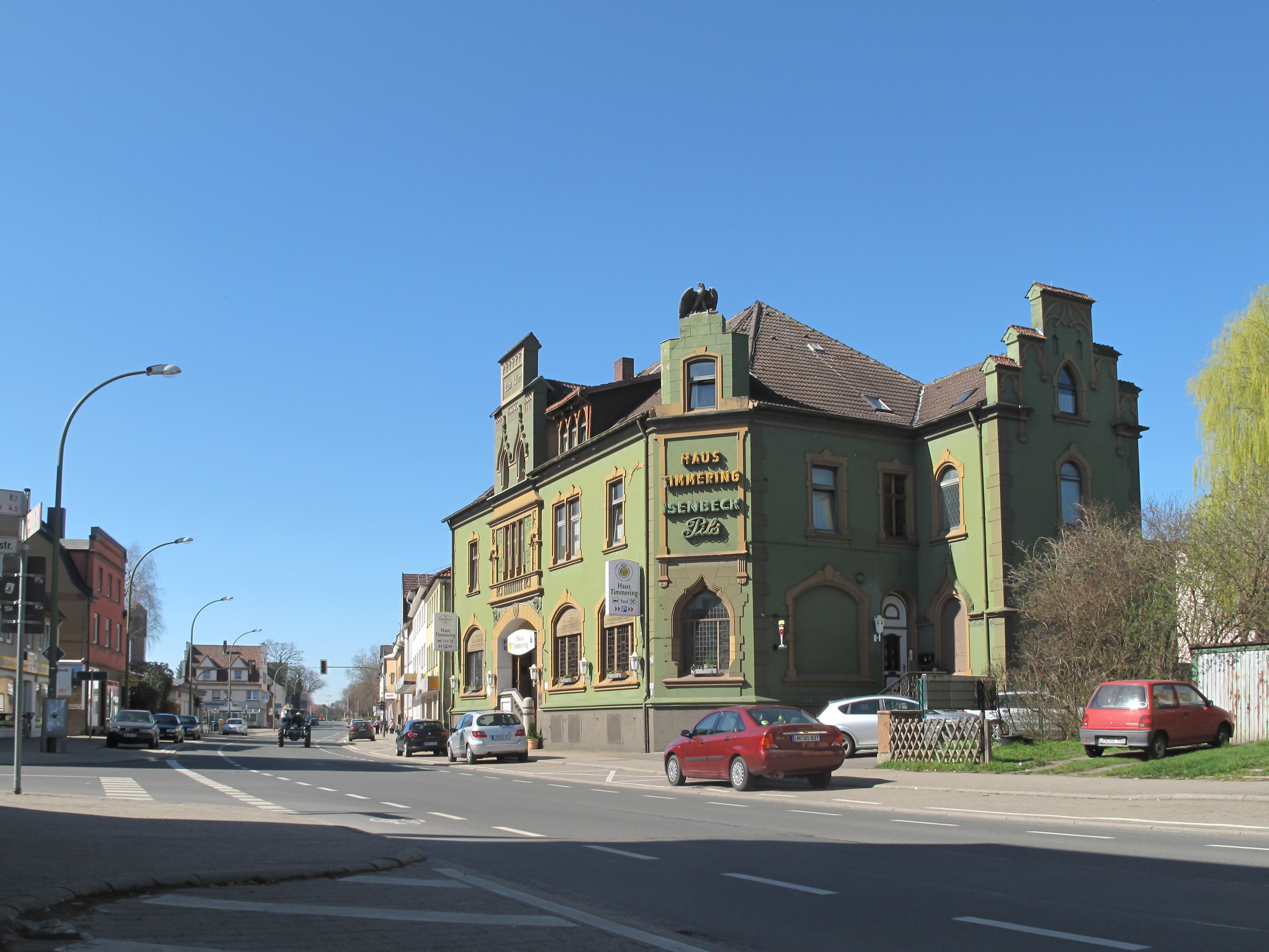
Gasthof at the Bahnhofstrasse
