= Erivan Haub =

German businessman (1932–2018)

- Born: 29 September 1932; Wiesbaden, Germany
- Died: 6 March 2018 (aged 85); Pinedale, Wyoming, United States
- Education: University of Hamburg
- Known for: Tengelmann Group
- Spouse: Helga Otto
- Children: 3, including Karl-Erivan Haub and Christian W.E. Haub
- Parent(s): Erich Haub; Elizabeth Schmitz-Scholl

Erivan Karl Matthias Haub (29 September 1932 – 6 March 2018) was a German billionaire businessman, and the managing director and part owner of Tengelmann Group, one of Germany's largest retailers. At the time of his death in March 2018, his net worth was estimated at US$6.4 billion.

== Early life ==
Erivan Haub was born 29 September 1932 in Wiesbaden, Germany. He was the son of Erich Haub and Elizabeth Haub (born Schmitz-Scholl) (1899–1977), who originated from the Mülheim family Schmitz-Scholl, the owners of the grocery chain Tengelmann.

== Career ==
After the Second World War, he completed two internships with the Jewel Tea company in Chicago and the Alpha-Beta company in La Habra, California, before returning to Germany to study economics at the University of Hamburg. In the 1960s, he and his wife lived in Tacoma, Washington. In July 2012 he, along with his wife Helga, made a contribution of more than 295 works of western American art to the Tacoma Art Museum. At one time, he was the 6th richest man in the U.S., just one position ahead of Bill Gates, but later dropped to about 250th. Haub died at his home in Wyoming, US.

He joined the family business in 1963. Upon the death of his uncle Karl Schmitz-Scholl in March 1969 he became the group's managing director. Haub concentrated the Tengelmann group business on the retail trade. Under his guidance Tengelmann expanded: in 1971 it took over the grocery chain Kaiser's; in 1972 Haub founded the discount grocery retailer Plus. In the following years, Tengelmann focused on the development of its international business, which led to the 1979 takeover of The Great Atlantic & Pacific Tea Company. In 2000, he handed the position over to his son Karl-Erivan, and joined the supervisory board.

== Family ==
Erivan Haub married Helga Otto in 1958. They lived in Wiesbaden and had three sons:

- Karl-Erivan Haub (1960-2018)
- Georg Haub
- Christian W.E. Haub (born 1964)

=== Honors ===
The Haub School of Business at Saint Joseph's University is named in his honour. The Helga Otto Haub School of Environment and Natural Resources at the University of Wyoming is named for his wife, Helga.

== See also ==
- List of billionaires
