= KiK =

German discount clothing store chain owned by Tengelmann Group

KiK Textilien und Non-Food GmbH

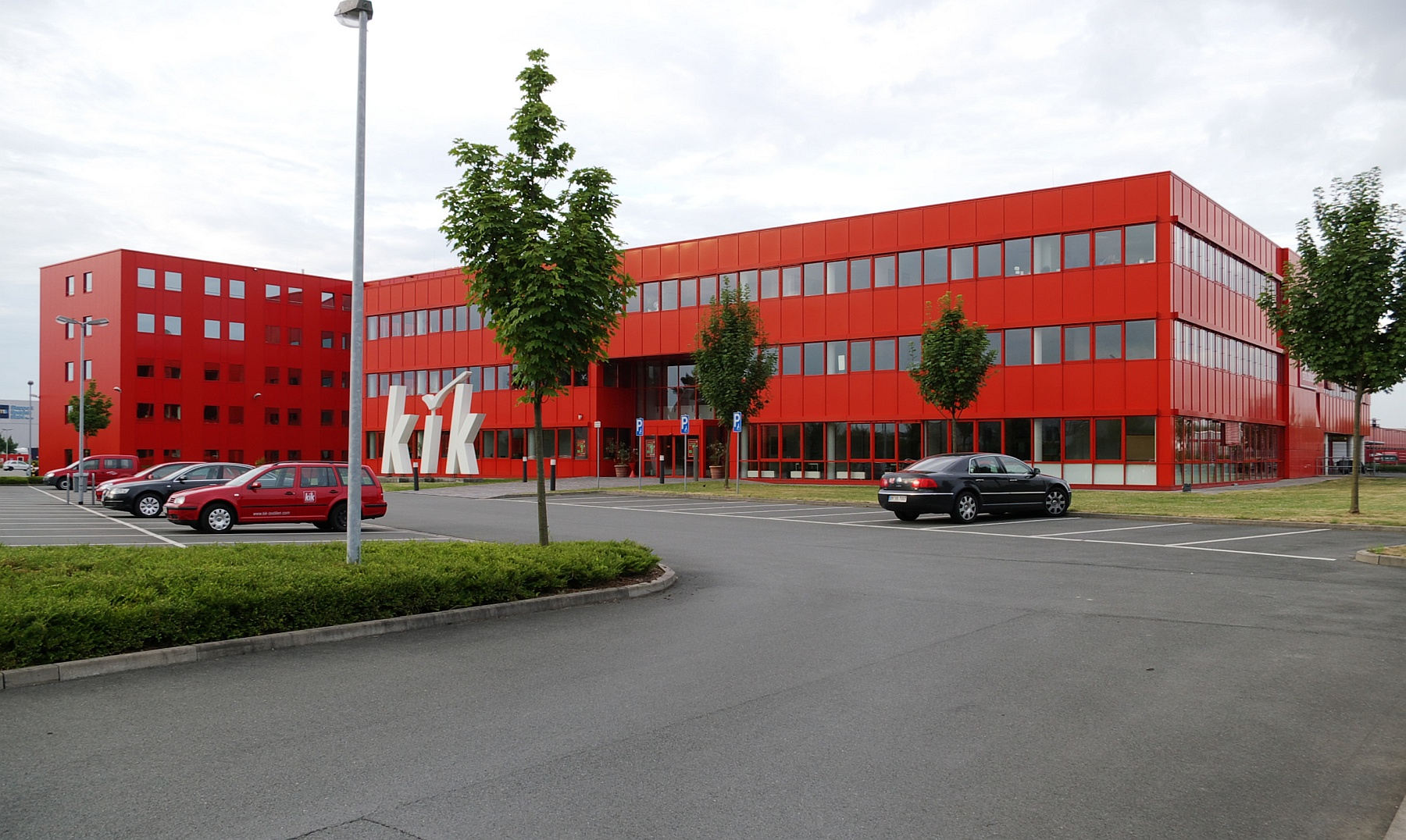
- Headquarters in Bönen, Germany
- Type: GmbH
- Industry: Retail
- Founded: April 1994
- Founder: Stefan Heinig, Tengelmann Group
- Headquarters: 275 Boën St., Bönen, Germany
- Area served: Germany, Austria, Slovenia, Czech Republic, Hungary, Slovakia, Croatia, Poland, Portugal, Netherlands, Italy, Romania, Bulgaria, Spain
- Key people: Patrick Zahn, CEO
- Products: Clothing and Non-Food products
- Revenue: € 1.95 (2016) billion
- Number of employees: 25,697
- Website: www.kik.de

KiK Textilien und Non-Food GmbH is a German clothing discount store chain headquartered in Bönen.

== Overview ==
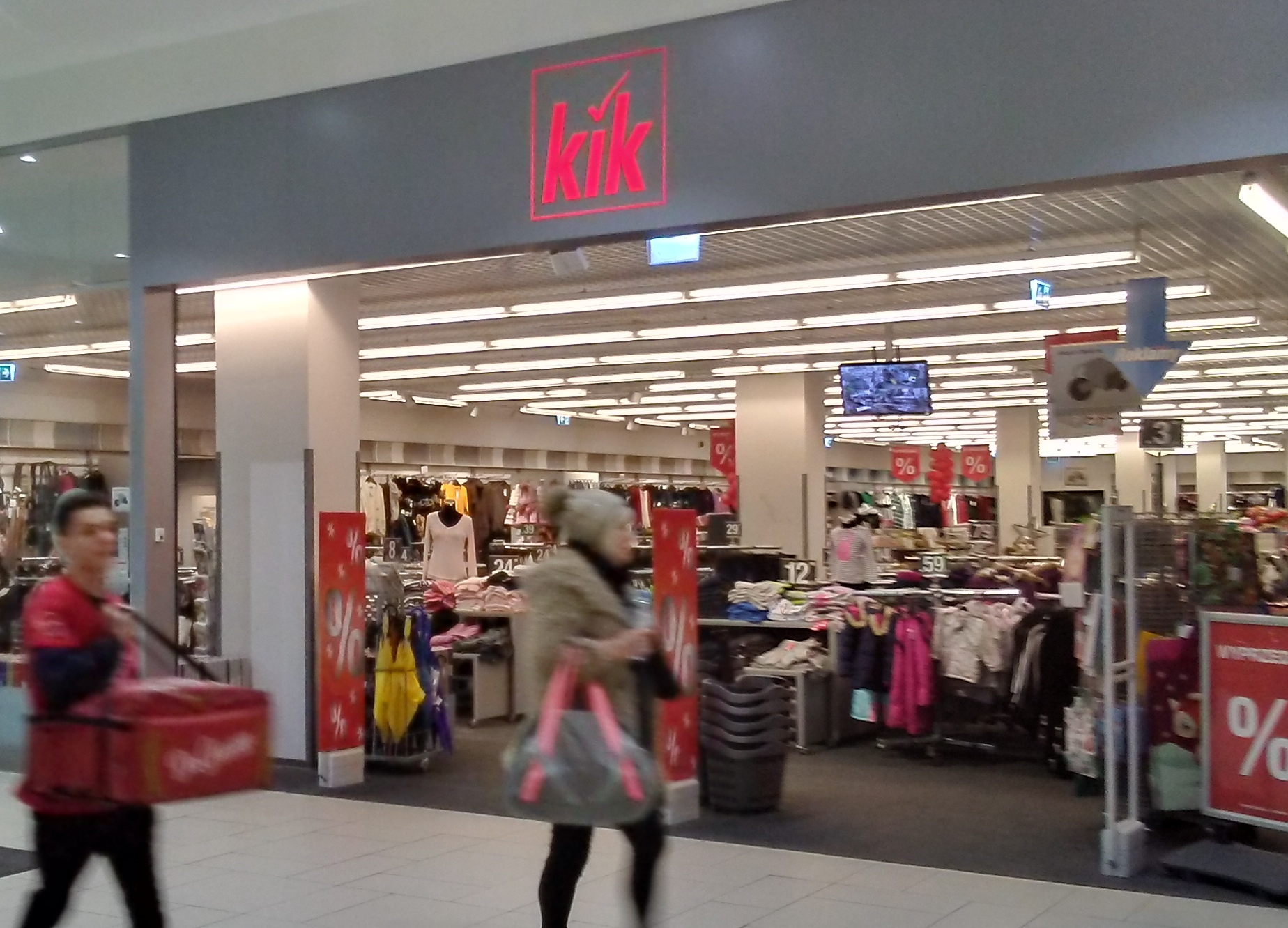
KiK in Tomaszów Mazowiecki, Poland

KiK was founded in 1994 by Stefan Heinig and the holding company Tengelmann Group. KiK is an acronym for "Kunde ist König" (English: The customer is king).

KiK is the largest textile discounter chain in Germany and operates about 3,500 shops in Germany, Austria (since 1998), Slovenia and Czech Republic (since 2007), Hungary and Slovakia (since 2008), Croatia (since 2011), Poland (since March 2012), and Netherlands (2013). KiK opened the first stores in Italy (2017), Romania (2018) and Portugal (2022). KiK-CEO Patrick Zahn has announced to enter the US market beginning in 2019. The first stores will be opened in the Midwest.

The company employs 25,000 employees, of which the bulk share works in Germany. In 2016, the company had net revenues of €1.95 billion, making it the sixth-largest textile manufacturer in Germany.

Starting in 2013, the company has undertaken a large modernisation offensive in all its shops. By the end of 2017, all shops in Germany as well as in foreign markets will be based on a new interior concept, making them look brighter and more pleasant. The dominant colour red will be largely substituted by silver.

The company sells a range of women's, men's and children's clothing, baby wear and underwear, as well as toys, accessories and home textiles. Customers can buy a complete outfit for less than 30 Euros. The focus is on basic styles with only occasional changes in their assortment. This makes the company independent of trends and seasons. The orders can be produced with long lead times from nine to 12 months without time pressure. KiK buys its products from around 500 suppliers in Bangladesh, China, Pakistan and Turkey, with Bangladesh the biggest contributor, accounting for over 40% of the orders. The products are imported to Germany based on sea freight and hence distributed to the nine foreign markets KiK is operating in.

== Online shop ==
Since 2013 KiK has operated an online shop.

== Marketing ==
KiK has, in the past, sponsored a number of football teams, namely Arminia Bielefeld, Werder Bremen, Hansa Rostock and VfL Bochum. They currently sponsor referees of the Austrian Football Bundesliga and in January 2009 also sponsored the German national team at the 2009 World Men's Handball Championship.

Verona Pooth has been the face of KiK's television advertising campaign. The cooperation ended in 2015.

== Sustainability ==
KiK has been a member of the German Partnership for Sustainable Textiles, a multi-stakeholder initiative to bring social, ecological and economic improvements along the textile supply chain since June 2015. This initiative by the German Ministry for Development and Cooperation, which is funded by commercial enterprises, non-governmental organisations, federal organisations and trade unions, is based on the belief that an improvement in manufacturing conditions in countries like Bangladesh or Pakistan cannot be brought about by individual companies alone. KiK is among over 150 members including Otto Group, Adidas, Hugo Boss and Puma and is engaged in all the initiative's working groups. It was among the first members of the Partnership to publish its catalogue of measures designed to provide greater transparency to consumers for products sold in Germany.

The company has published four sustainability reports.

In October 2015, KiK banned plastic bags from all its shops in Germany, Austria, the Netherlands and Hungary. Through this measure, the company saves about 33 million plastic bags per year.

The retailer is the first company in Germany with a contract in place which holds auditing companies legally liable for findings in the reports.

== Criticism ==
=== Building collapse at Savar ===
On 24 April 2013, the eight-story Rana Plaza commercial building collapsed in Savar, a sub-district near Dhaka, the capital of Bangladesh. At least 1,127 people died and over 2,438 were injured. The factory housed several separate garment factories employing around 5,000 people, and manufactured apparel for brands including the Benetton Group, Joe Fresh, The Children's Place, Primark, Monsoon, and Dressbarn. Of the 29 brands identified as having sourced products from the Rana Plaza factories, only 9 attended meetings held in November 2013 to agree a proposal on compensation to the victims. KiK was the second German company to contribute to the compensation fund. Several companies refused to sign including Walmart, Carrefour, Bonmarché, Mango, Auchan. The agreement was also signed by Primark, Loblaws, Bonmarché and El Corte Inglés.

The retailer was one of the first German signatories of the Accord on Fire and Building Safety in Bangladesh set up in May 2013 to inspect and remediate factories for fire, electrical and building safety and was also among a group of global union federations and brands that have prepared the continuation of the work of the Accord in Bangladesh once its five-year remit comes to an end in 2018.

=== Swastika-styled clothing racks ===
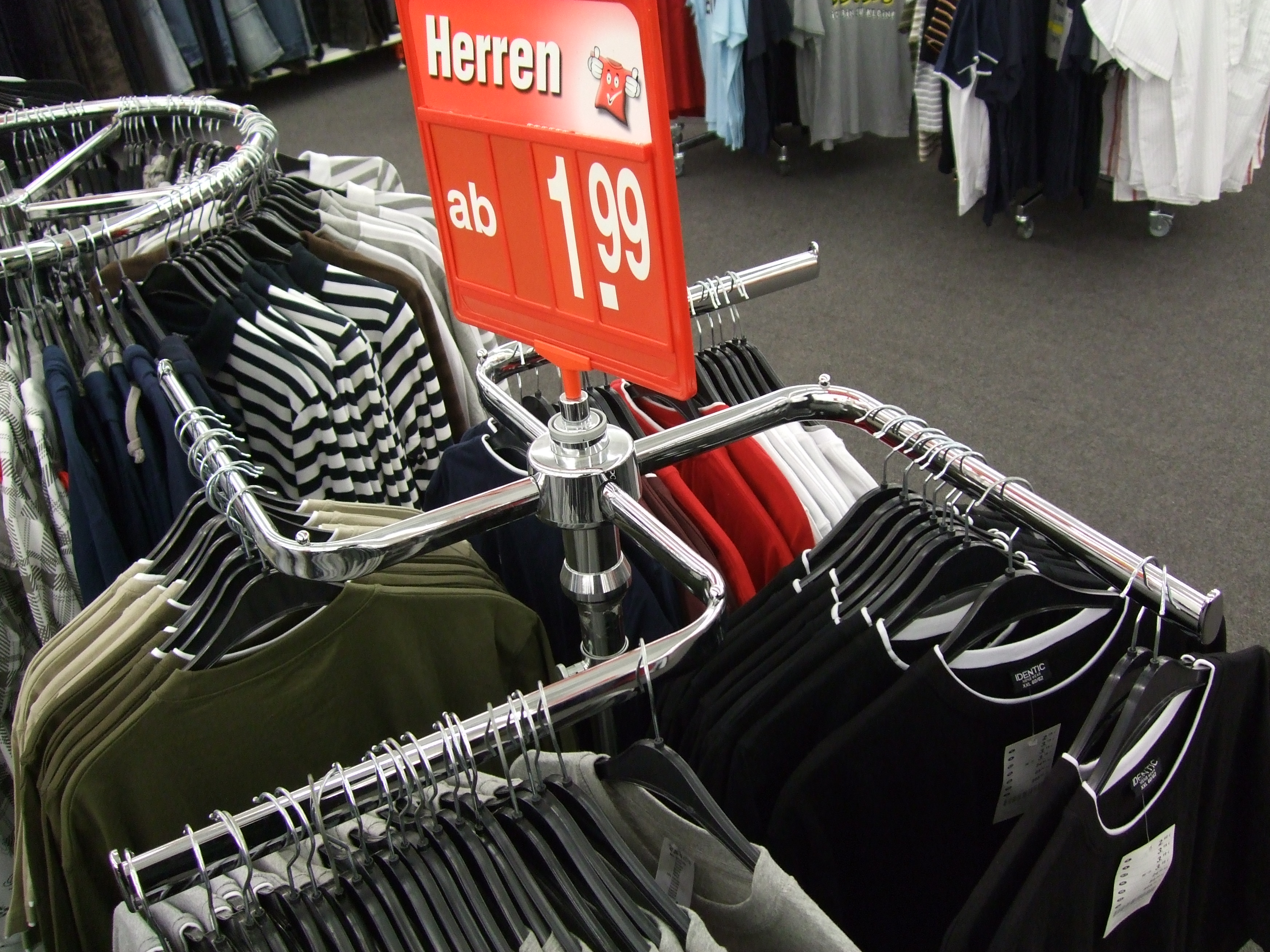
KiK's swastika-styled clothing racks

In 2009, a man from the German state Schleswig-Holstein pressed charges against KiK under Strafgesetzbuch section 86a, which outlaws the "use of symbols of unconstitutional organisations", for the chain using swastika-styled clothing racks in their shops. KiK describes the allegations as incomprehensible.

=== Wages for factory workers ===
KiK has been criticised by the Clean Clothes Campaign for their bad practices in countries such as Bangladesh, where factory workers are paid low wages. In 2006, KiK has published a Code of Conduct, which imposes an obligation to suppliers to pay compensation to workers that cover at least the legal or the industrial minimum wage level, whichever is higher. KiK CEO Zahn has appealed on the government of Bangladesh to raise the minimum wage by ten percent.

=== Secret credit ratings of staff ===
While running almost 50,000 secret credit ratings of staff, overtime is often not paid. With the introduction of the legal minimum wage in Germany, KiK pays its staff minimum wage or higher.

== See also ==
- NKD (retailer)
