= HSB Televisión =

Television station in Bogotá, Colombia

HSB Televisión is a Colombian local television station based in Bogotá, broadcasting on Channel 55 UHF. Its broadcasting licence was granted by the National Television Commission on 23 April 2004. It is owned by former Congressman Hernando Suárez Burgos and operated by the Politécnico Santafé de Bogotá. It also manages the news media center HSBNoticias.com one of the most important news portal in the country where they meet several of the most recognized independent media and journalists. Founded in 2013 with its main office in the city of Bogota, Colombia.
