= AmeriHealth =

American health insurance company

- Trade name: AmeriHealth
- Company type: Subsidiary
- Industry: Health Insurance
- Founded: 1994
- Headquarters: Cranbury, New Jersey
- Products: Health Insurance
- Number of employees: 130
- Parent: Independence Blue Cross
- Website: www.amerihealth.com

AmeriHealth is a provider of health insurance to employers and individuals throughout New Jersey. AmeriHealth is headquartered in Cranbury.

AmeriHealth offers nationwide coverage through PHCS, a Preferred Provider Organization (PPO). The company offers insurance through AmeriHealth's wellness benefits and incentive programs.

== History ==
AmeriHealth, known initially as Delaware Valley HMO, was established in 1995 to provide health coverage to Pennsylvania employers and their staff residing in Burlington, Camden, Gloucester, and Salem counties of New Jersey. It expanded its coverage area to include southern New Jersey and Delaware, and by 1997, AmeriHealth offered coverage to the entire state of New Jersey. In 2013, AmeriHealth announced it would be offering plans in New Jersey on the federally run health insurance exchange.

== Wellness programs ==
AmeriHealth provides employer on-site health coaching with a nurse wellness specialist to small- and mid-sized New Jersey–based organizations. Workplace wellness services include sending registered nurses to provide a broad spectrum of on-site health education, seminars, screenings, and support. AmeriHealth offers an incentive-based wellness program, called Embrace Well-Being, which provides individuals and groups with tools to "support wellness and rewards for living a healthy lifestyle".

== Community involvement ==
AmeriHealth is the name sponsor of the New Jersey Devils’ practice facility, the AmeriHealth Pavilion. When this sponsorship was announced, news reports cited AmeriHealth's desire to contribute to the “revitalization of Newark.”

AmeriHealth is also a sponsor and participant in Special Olympics New Jersey's annual “Lincoln Tunnel Challenge.” In 2009 the event drew a record crowd of 3,500 runners and walkers to the tunnel. Additionally, AmeriHealth sponsors and participates in the Benjamin Franklin Bridge Challenge, which benefits the Larc School for disabled students; and sponsors Rutgers University and several local minor league baseball teams.
