= Elisabeth Haub =

German philanthropist

Amalie Luise Elisabeth Haub (September 20, 1899, in Mülheim an der Ruhr – January 24, 1977, in Bonn) was a German heiress, philanthropist and environmentalist.

== Life and work ==
Elisabeth was born in 1899 to entrepreneur Karl Schmitz-Scholl Sr. and his wife Elisabeth, née Weynen, in Mülheim, to what was a merchant family. When her father died in 1933, she and her brother Karl Schmitz-Scholl Jr. inherited their father's company, Unternehmensgruppe Tengelmann, now Tengelmann Warenhandelsgesellschaft KG. She looked after the business until her brother's return from captivity in 1947. Her son, Erivan Haub took over in 1969 after Karl Schmitz-Scholl Jr.'s death as he was childless, remaining at the helm for three decades.

== Philanthropy ==
To mark the centenary of her father's birth, she founded the Karl Schmitz-Scholl Fund in 1968, a foundation for the promotion of environmental protection.

Since 1973, the International Council of Environmental Law (ICEL) and the Université libre de Bruxelles have annually awarded the Elisabeth Haub Prize for Environmental Law. This task is performed by an international jury consisting of six prominent environment lawyers, which considers the most important diplomatic achievements in the field of environmental law and policy in the preceding year. In 2008, this task was taken over by the Stockholm University. Since 1998, the ICEL together with Pace University also award the Elisabeth Haub Prize for Environmental Diplomacy.

In 1975 she founded the Haub Zais Foundation for Monument Protection in Wiesbaden. The Foundation is named after her late husband, Erich Haub, and his great-grandfather, the city architect, Christian Zais.

Her daughter-in-law, Helga Haub, established the Elisabeth Haub Foundations for Environmental Law and Policy, with offices in Washington DC and Toronto. To mark the 75th birthday of Erivan Haub, the Elisabeth Haub Foundation established an office in Germany. Helga Haub remains chairwoman of the organisation.

As of 2015, the latest recipients of the Elisabeth Haub Award for Environmental Diplomacy are Macharia Kamau and Csaba Kőrösi, Permanent Representatives to the United Nations for Kenya and Hungary, respectively. This prize was awarded in the presence of UN Secretary-General Ban Ki-moon.

On May 5, 2016, Pace University announced that its law school, renowned for its environmental law program, was renamed the Elisabeth Haub School of Law, in recognition of Haub's environmental advocacy and philanthropy.

== Sources ==
- Neue Ruhr Zeitung v. January 26, 1977.
- Stadtarchiv Mülheim an der Ruhr, inventory 1550 No. 207.
- This article incorporates translated text from the corresponding German Wikipedia article.
