= Karl-Erivan Haub =

German-American-Russian businessman

- Born: March 2, 1960; Tacoma, Washington, U.S.
- Disappeared: April 7, 2018 (aged 58); Skiing in the Swiss Alps, Klein Matterhorn, Switzerland
- Status: Declared dead on May 14, 2021
- Education: University of St. Gallen (MBA)
- Known for: CEO and part-owner, Tengelmann Group
- Children: 2
- Parents: Erivan Haub (father); Helga Haub (mother)
- Relatives: Elizabeth Haub (grandmother); Christian Haub (brother); George Haub

Karl-Erivan Haub (March 2, 1960 – disappeared April 7, 2018) was an American-born German billionaire businessman. He was managing director and part owner of Tengelmann Group. He disappeared while mountaineering on April 7, 2018, and was legally declared dead by a German court in May 2021.

== Life and family ==
Karl-Erivan Haub was born on March 2, 1960, in Tacoma, Washington, the eldest son of Erivan Haub, former CEO of Tengelmann Group. From 1978 to 1983, Haub studied economics and social sciences at the University of St. Gallen, Switzerland. At the same time, he was a trainee at Tengelmann Group. According to Forbes, the Haub family is one of the wealthiest in the world.

== Disappearance ==
Haub was an experienced ski mountaineer. On April 7, 2018, a month after his father's death, he went training for a skiing tour in Zermatt, Switzerland and did not return, thus being reported as missing. Reportedly, he intended to take part in the Patrouille des Glaciers, the world's biggest ski touring race which starts in Zermatt (respectively in the valley to the west, Arolla), and ends in Verbier. He had taken part in this 53 km long race for several years.

Following his disappearance, Tengelmann announced that Haub's brother, Christian, would be appointed sole CEO of Tengelmann Group effective April 18, 2018. A week after he went missing, the search was called off and Haub is now presumed dead. In October 2018, the search was discontinued due to an increasing lack of prospects of success.

On May 14, 2021, the district court in Cologne formally declared Haub dead, officially listing his time of death as midnight on April 7, 2018. However, in May 2023, a report appeared in the German magazine Stern that Haub might have actually escaped to live a new life in Russia, and might have been seen in Moscow in 2021. The magazine refers to CCTV footage obtained from a source in the FSB. According to journalists, the coincidence of appearance is 90%.

In December 2025, the Swiss media outlet blue News reported on newly released documents from the Epstein files, according to which the Valais cantonal police had examined possible links in 2020 between the disappearance of Karl-Erivan Haub and the death of Jeffrey Epstein. The inquiry was initiated after Mark Epstein, Jeffrey Epstein’s brother, contacted authorities, citing a threat against his family and alleged contacts with individuals from Haub’s circle.

== Career ==
Haub worked for Nestlé and McKinsey & Company before joining Tengelmann again. In 2000, Haub became CEO of Tengelmann Group.

== See also ==
- List of people who disappeared mysteriously (2000–present)
