= Tengelmann Group =

German retail holding company

Tengelmann-Group
- Type: Limited commercial partnership (Kommanditgesellschaft)
- Industry: Retail, Real Estate, Venture Capital
- Headquarters: Munich, Germany
- Key people: Christian W. E. Haub, CEO
- Revenue: 8,385 Mrd. Euro (2021)
- Number of employees: 65.050 (2021, worldwide)
- Website: tengelmann21.com

Tengelmann Twenty-One KG is the Munich-based Holding of the Tengelmann Group, a family-owned company established in 1867. The company identifies as an active entrepreneurial family investor, currently holding shares in more than 50 companies in Europe and North America. The diverse portfolio includes large retailers such as OBI and KiK, the real estate company TREI, the energy consulting company Tengelmann Energie, the insurance company Tengelmann Assekuranz as well as Tengelmann Audit. Their affiliated investment companies Tengelmann Ventures, Emil Capital Partners and Tengelmann Growth Partners invest in Start-ups and Grown-ups in Europe and North America.

== History ==
=== Founding (1840s-1887) ===
In the mid-19th century, Johann Wilhelm Meininghaus (1790-1869) established the colonial goods store Joh. Wilh. Meininghaus Sohn in the Villa Artis, located in the inner city park “Ruhranlage” in Mülheim an der Ruhr. On January 1, 1847, a 15-year-old named Wilhelm Schmitz began his commercial apprenticeship there, which later led to his professional career. Due to his abilities, he took over the company’s management, now known as Wilh. Schmitz & Lindgens, alongside Ludwig Lindgens (1827-1910) in 1857. Lindgens, who was primarily a financial partner and had already established the Lindgens leather factory with his wife in 1861, retired from the business at the end of 1866. To distinguish himself from the numerous Schmitz families in Rhineland, Schmitz added his wife Louise’s maiden name to his own, and Wilhelm Schmitz-Scholl oHG was founded on January 1, 1867. Louise Schmitz-Scholl became the first woman in Germany to have signing authority. In the early 1880s, Schmitz began roasting coffee and eventually opened a large roasting plant in 1882.

=== Domestic Expansion (1887-1972) ===
Following Wilhelm Schmitz’s death in 1887, his sons Wilhelm Jr. and Karl assumed control of the company. The brothers established their own retail outlets for their products. Their authorized representative, Emil Tengelmann, whose name inspired the company Hamburger Kaffee-Import-Gesellschaft Emil Tengelmann, founded in 1893, assisted them in expanding the business. The first branch for coffee, tea, and cocoa opened in Düsseldorf. Due to its tremendous success, an additional 560 branches were established throughout Germany by the onset of World War I.

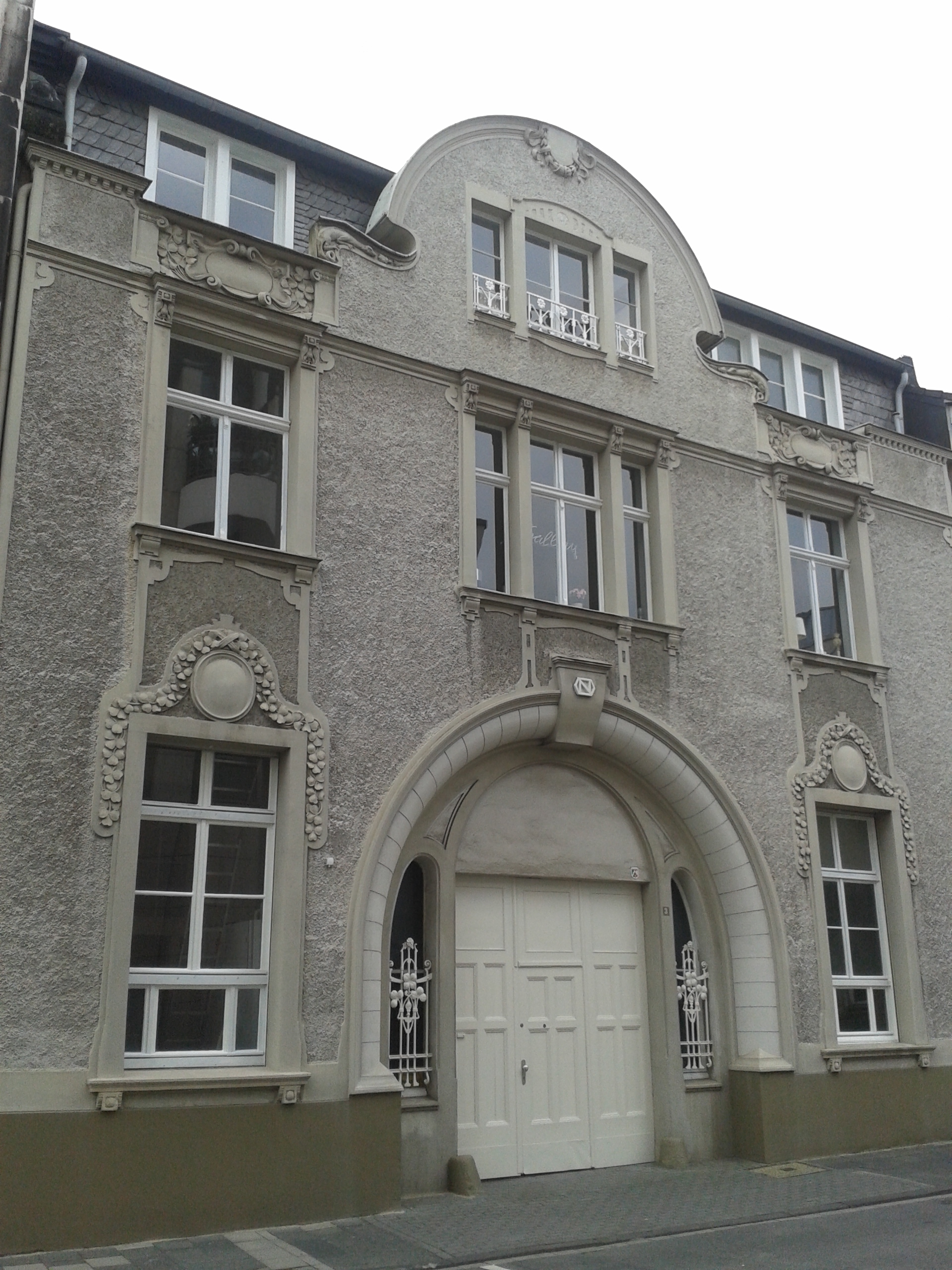
Mainhouse in Ruhrstraße 3–5 in Mülheim an der Ruhr

In 1906, the first proprietary production company, the Rheinische Zuckerwarenfabrik, was established in Düsseldorf. In 1912, the Wissoll cocoa and chocolate factory (Wilhelm Schmitz-Scholl) was added in Speldorf, where the group’s headquarters were located until the property was sold to the Viennese real estate developer Soravia. The relocation to Munich occurred in the fall of 2021.

During the 1920s, additional production facilities were established, including factories for grain and malt coffee, pudding powder, cookies, and nutritional products. The number of branches increased again to 540 by 1927, the year Wilhelm Jr. died. After the death of Karl Schmitz-Scholl senior in 1933, the company was inherited by his two children Elisabeth Haub and Karl-Erivan Schmitz-Scholl, who became the sole managing director. During the Nazi era, Schmitz-Scholl was a supporter and member of the NSDAP and the SS (Hauptsturmführer). Tengelmann also produced special food for the Wehrmacht. Since 2011, Lutz Niethammer’s team has been analyzing, using biographical, corporate strategy, and cultural studies approaches, whether and to what extent the company was involved in forced labor, Aryanization, occupation rule, and war profits. The SS membership of the then boss Karl Schmidt-Scholl Jr. and his conduct between the company, family, SS, and Wehrmacht were also investigated.

Following the company’s reconstruction after World War II, the first Tengelmann self-service store was opened in Munich in 1953. In its anniversary year of 1967/68, the company operated over 400 stores, with sales exceeding the billion mark for the first time. In 1969, Erivan Haub, son of Elisabeth Haub, became the sole managing partner of Schmitz-Scholl/Tengelmann in accordance with the articles of association. In 1971, the company took over its competitor Kaiser’s Kaffee Geschäft AG in Viersen.

=== International Expansion (1972-2000) ===
In 1972, Tengelmann founded the brand discounter Plus as a second mainstay. Tengelmann has owned the Plus brand since 1911. Subsequently, Tengelmann acquired stakes in companies around the world or took over a majority shareholding, such as in The Great Atlantic and Pacific Tea Company (New Jersey) in 1979, or A&P for short. In 1984, the company acquired a majority stake in Hermans Groep in the Netherlands and rebranded its supermarkets and hypermarkets as A&P in 1994. The Dutch business was sold again in 2000.

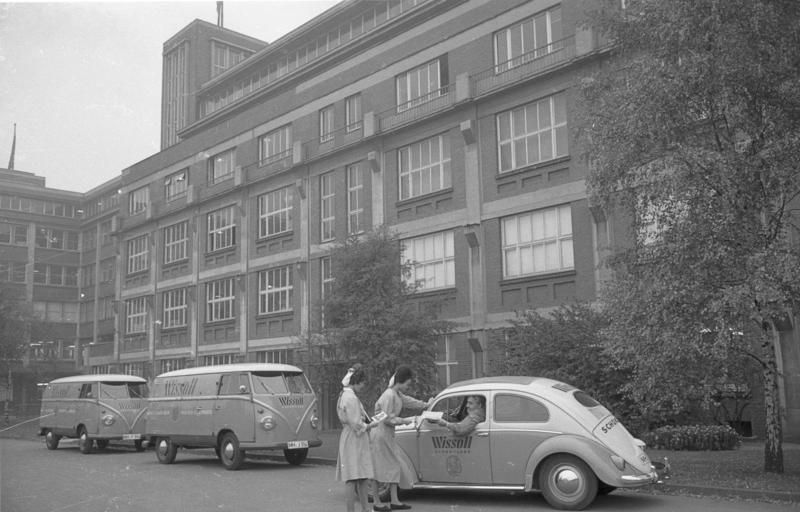

At the end of the 1980s, Tengelmann expanded its portfolio with the textile and consumer goods discounter Rudis Reste Rampe. In 1997, the decision was made to concentrate on the food business and all 156 stores were sold to the Berlin-based Wand-&-Boden Group. After the fall of the Iron Curtain, the company also expanded into the former Eastern Bloc by opening Plus stores in Hungary and Poland. In 1990, Tengelmann took over the Modea textile chain. This was followed seven years later by a management buy-out and the renaming of the company to Takko ModeMarkt GmbH & Co. KG. Today, the company operates under the name Takko Holding GmbH. The Tengelmann Group is no longer involved.

=== Consolidation (2000- ) ===
In 2000, Erivan Haub handed over the operational business to his sons Karl-Erivan Haub and Christian W. E. Haub. The 111 department stores of Grosso and Magnet were sold, 66 of them to Lidl & Schwarz. In the same year, the first OBI store was opened in the People’s Republic of China in Wuxi. Tengelmann-Warenhandelsgesellschaft has been a limited partnership since 2002. On June 30, 2003, Wilh. Schmitz-Scholl Schokoladen- und Zuckerwaren GmbH (Wissoll) was taken over by the Dortmund-based confectionery manufacturer van Netten GmbH. van Netten filed for insolvency on October 18, 2012; after an unsuccessful search for an investor, liquidation followed in June 2013. In April 2005, the Chinese Obi stores were sold to the British DIY chain Kingfisher. On May 1, 2005, Tengelmann sold the 307 stores of the drugstore chain kd kaiser’s drugstore GmbH to Rossmann GmbH. In the same year, the Hungarian and Slovenian Interfruct Cash & Carry stores and the Canadian subsidiary of the A&P Tea Company were also sold.

In 2007, A&P took over the American supermarket chain Pathmark with 141 stores. In the same year, the Spanish Plus stores were sold to the French retailer Carrefour and the stores in Poland and Portugal were sold to the Portuguese retail chain Jerónimo Martins.

Die „letzte“ Tengelmann-Tragetasche mit „I'm green“ aus Zuckerrohr von 2018

On January 1, 2009, Plus merged with Netto Marken-Discount, part of the Edeka group; Edeka holds an 85 percent majority stake in the newly founded company. Plus and Netto together now achieve sales figures similar to the industry leaders Lidl and Aldi. The Plus stores were rebranded as Netto by mid-2010. In 2008, the Czech Plus stores were sold to Rewe Group, the Hungarian stores to Spar Austria and the Greek stores to the Belgian retail chain Delhaize Group. On February 19, 2010, the Bulgarian and Romanian Plus stores were sold to the discounter Lidl. The Austrian branches of the Plus brand, which are operated as Zielpunkt, were sold to the German-Luxembourgish financial investor BluO.

In 2010, Woolworth Germany was acquired, but these shares were sold in 2012. The Tengelmann supermarkets in the Rhine-Main region were sold to Rewe and Tegut.

The sale of the Tengelmann stores to Edeka initially failed in August 2015 due to antitrust concerns. In March 2016, the Federal Minister of Economics Sigmar Gabriel finally approved the sale to Edeka with a ministerial authorization. At the end of October 2016, Sigmar Gabriel and Verdi boss Frank Bsirske announced the agreement between the bosses of Edeka and Rewe, Markus Mosa and Alain Caparros.

In December 2020, Tengelmann acquired all shares in Kik in exchange for the TEDi shares.

In July 2022, the Obi business in Russia with 27 stores at the time was sold to the Russian financial and real estate investor MAX for a symbolic purchase price.

== Further information ==
During the 1994 general election campaign, the Haub family ran newspaper advertisements advocating for the re-election of the incumbent Chancellor, Helmut Kohl (CDU), under the slogan “When in doubt, vote for Kohl”. In 2005, this campaign was reprised for the then opposition leader, Angela Merkel (CDU), with the slogan “When in doubt, choose a woman”. In 2013, the Haub family once again used advertisements to encourage people to vote for the CDU/CSU. Referring to the Merkel diamond and the Steinbrück stink finger, they advised readers to “when in doubt, vote for the diamond”.

Starting from 1995, the so-called “Run for Tengelmann” was held annually. The participation fees were donated to organizations that support disabled sports. In 2014, only a scaled-down run took place due to the Whitsun storm Ela. Only the school runs were initiated, as large parts of the senior courses were impassable due to fallen trees or falling branches. The event has not been held since 2016. With the withdrawal from the food business, sponsors from the food industry are no longer available. In May 2017, an open day was held on a much smaller scale.

Karl-Erivan Haub, the former managing partner of Tengelmann Warenhandelsgesellschaft KG, has been missing since April 7, 2018. He disappeared during his training for the Patrouille des Glaciers in the Matterhorn region. On April 17, 2018, his brother Christian Haub assumed sole management of the Group. On May 14, 2021, the Cologne District Court declared Karl-Erivan Haub dead. This was preceded by an application by the two brothers, Christian and Georg, who wanted to have their brother declared dead in October 2020; at that time, all three brothers each held a third of the company shares. However, Georg Haub withdrew from this application in January 2021. After reaching an agreement with Katrin Haub, Karl-Erivan’s widow, to sell the third of the company shares held by her husband to brother Christian after his death, she agreed in April 2021 to have her husband declared dead. The purchase price is said to be at least 1.1 billion euros. In June 2021, Christian Haub became the majority shareholder of the Tengelmann Group with the purchase of additional shares in the company.

== Business areas ==
=== Current businesses ===
The company has four business divisions (Retail, Venture & Growth, Real Estate and Other) to which the Group subsidiaries are subordinated as follows:

==== Retail ====
===== KiK =====
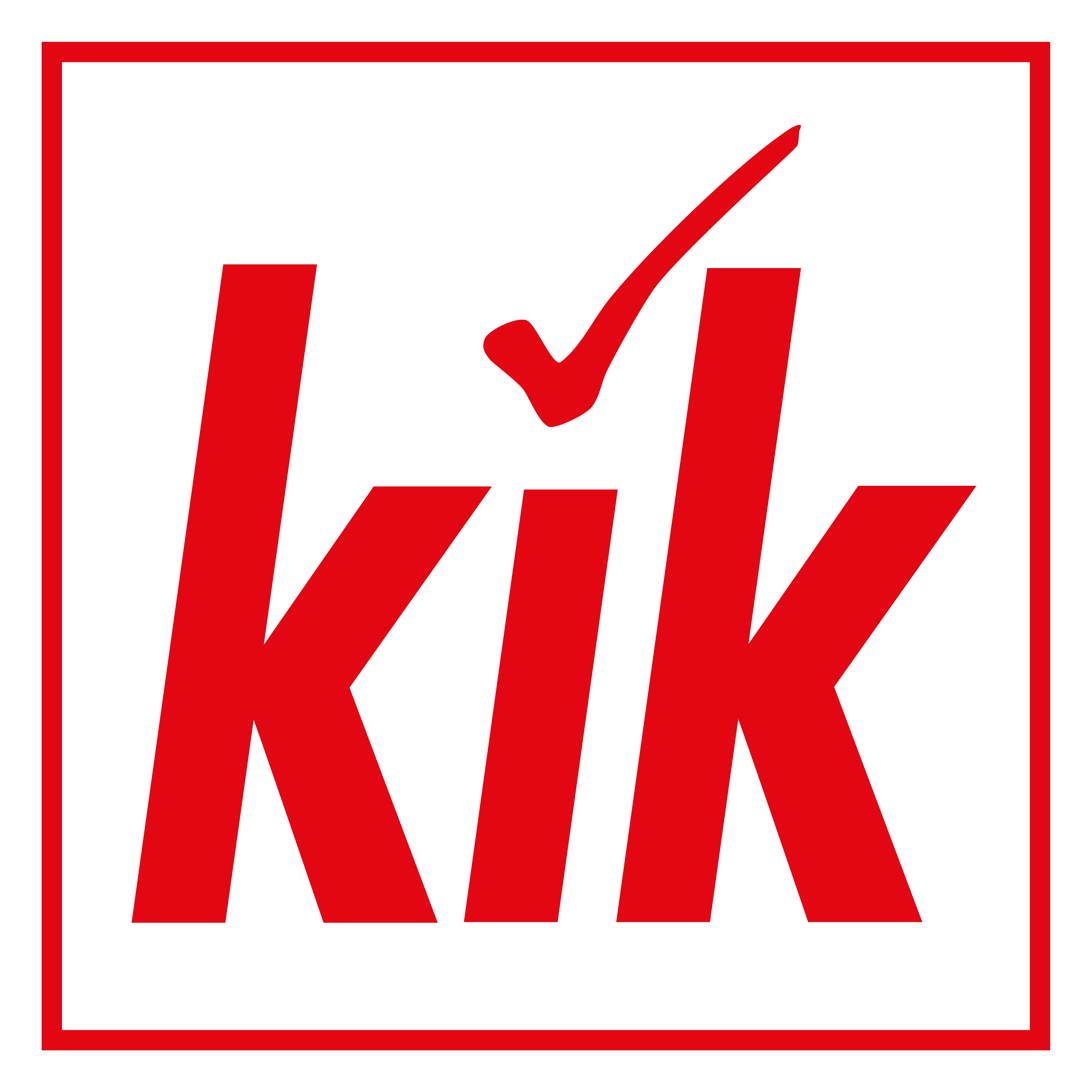
KiK logo

Tengelmann holds almost 100 percent of the textile discounter with 4,047 stores in twelve countries, a total turnover of 1.8 billion euros and 29,000 employees:

Country	Number of Stores
Germany	2583
Croatia	85
Austria	257
Slovakia	101
Slovenia	61
Czech Republic	223
Hungary	104
Netherlands	43
Poland	415
Italy	74
Portugal	50
Romania	80
Bulgaria	21

===== OBI =====
OBI logo

Tengelmann holds a 74 percent stake in Obi. Obi operates 645 DIY stores (chain stores and franchise partner stores) in 10 countries and generates total sales of 6.1 billion Euros with 34,932 employees:

Country	Number of Stores
Germany	351
Bosnia and Herzegovina	1
Italy	57
Austria	79
Poland	59
Slovakia	16
Switzerland	11
Slovenia	8
Czech Republic	33
Hungary	30

==== Venture & Growth ====
babymarkt.de

Tengelmann Growth Partners (TGP)

Emil Capital Partners (ECP)

Tengelmann Ventures (TEV)

==== Real Estate ====
Trei Real Estate

==== Other ====
Tengelmann Assekuranz

Tengelmann Audit (TAG)

Tengelmann Energie (TEG)

=== Former businesses ===
==== Tengelmann E-Commerce GmbH ====
E-commerce subsidiary of the Tengelmann Group; it was a 100 percent subsidiary. This included Garten XXL and Plus.de, as well as Tengelmann Ventures GmbH, through which the Tengelmann Group has been investing in e-commerce since 2010. This included, among others, Zalando, Westwing, babymarkt.de, youtailor.de, Enólogos, stylight.de, and since mid-2011, the coffee startup Coffee Circle from Berlin. Garten XXL and Plus.de were taken over by the Edeka Group and integrated into Netto Marken-Discount.

==== Netto Marken-Discount ====
15 percent of the food discounter as a silent participation from November 2009. In July 2020, the sale of the Netto participation to Edeka was announced for January 1, 2021.

==== TEDi ====
Until January 1, 2021, Tengelmann held 35 percent of the one-euro discounter with 1794 branches.

==== Former Distribution Lines ====
===== Accos =====
Food chain, existed from 1950, belonged to Tengelmann from 1978 and was rebranded to Kaiser’s Tengelmann in 1992 (except for four branches).

===== Grosso-Magnet =====
Self-service department store chain with branches in Germany and Austria. The German branches were sold in parts to Bartels-Langness, the Dohle Group, and the Schwarz Group in 2000. The Magnet branches in Austria went to ADEG.

===== Gubi =====
Gubi (abbreviation for Gut (Good) and Billig (cheap)), a food chain headquartered in Donauwörth, was founded in 1911 by the Proeller family and became part of the Tengelmann Group in 1987. By the turn of the millennium, the branches disappeared and were rebranded to Kaiser’s Tengelmann. The meat plant at the headquarters was attached to the subsidiary Birkenhof (now part of Edeka Südwest), and the in-house nursery and bakery were closed.

===== Kd Kaiser´s drugstore =====
Drugstore chain, founded in 1969 as a subsidiary of Kaiser’s, with over 500 branches in Germany at peak times. From 2003, there was a cooperation with Rossmann, and in 2005, the company along with the remaining branches was sold to Rossmann.

===== Kaiser´s Tengelmann =====
Full-range supermarkets with 501 branches and 1.94 billion euros in sales in Germany, 16,514 employees (2013). In October 2014, it was announced that the supermarkets were to be sold to Edeka. The Cartel Office did not give its approval; however, the German Federal Minister of Economics, Sigmar Gabriel, indicated a ministerial permit under strict conditions, which was temporarily stopped by the Higher Regional Court of Düsseldorf in the summer of 2016. Nevertheless, the negotiation talks between Edeka and Tengelmann continued, and an agreement was reached regarding the takeover. On January 1, 2017, the Kaiser’s Tengelmann division changed owners. Since then, it is no longer part of the Tengelmann Group, but now belongs to Edeka.

===== LeDi =====
LeDi (abbreviation for LebensmittelDiscount), a hard discounter, existed from 1992 and merged into the Plus Warenhandelsgesellschaft in 1999, the branches were rebranded to Plus.

===== Plus =====
Soft discounter with branches in several European countries. The German branches were sold to Edeka in 2009 and rebranded to Netto Marken-Discount.

== Literature ==
- Lutz Niethammer (Hrsg.): Tengelmann im Dritten Reich: Ein Familienunternehmen des Lebensmittelhandels und der Nationalsozialismus. Mit Beiträgen von Karin Hartewig, Almut Leh und Daniela Rüther. Klartext Verlag, Essen 2020, ISBN 978-3-8375-1223-6.
- Daniela Rüther: Der „Fall Nährwert“. Ein Wirtschaftskrimi aus der Zeit des Zweiten Weltkrieges, Wallstein Verlag, Göttingen ²2021, ISBN 978-3-8353-3744-2.
