= List of Woolworth divisions and namesakes =

Divisions and namesakes of the American F. W. Woolworth Company, and divisions of Woolworths Group (Australia).

Similar namesake companies in South Africa and Australia were legally named after the Woolworth company as permitted by the trademark laws of the period, but never had any financial connection to the original F. W. Woolworth Company. The reorganized American company is currently known as Dick's Sporting Goods following a 2025 acquisition.

Division	Region	Type	Relation	Period	Note
F. W. Woolworth Company	North America	Five and dime	-	1878–1997	Main subject of this list
Afterthoughts	North America	Accessories	Division	c. 1970s–1999	Sold to Claire's and rebranded as Icing chain
The Bargain! Shop	North America	Discount store	Spin-off	1991–Present	Sold in 1999
Best of Times	North America	Watch store	Division	1990s	All stores closed 1998
CCS	North America	Skateboards	Acquisition	2008-2014	Later sold to Daddies Board Shop
Champs Sports	North America	Sporting goods	Acquisition	1987–Present	
Dick's Sporting Goods	North America	Sporting goods	Successor	2025-present	Acquired Foot Locker, Inc. in 2025.
Eastbay	North America	Mail order	Acquisition	1997–present	Acquired in early 1997
Foot Locker	North America	Shoe Store	Successor	1974–2025	In 1989, moved from Kinney to the new Woolworth Athletic Group division. Company renamed Foot Locker in 2001. The Woolworth company eventually focused on sporting goods only and adopted this name. Acquired by Dick's Sporting Goods in 2025.
Golf Galaxy	North America	Golf store	Division	2025-present	Formed in 1997, acquired by Dick's in 2006. Became part of this tree in 2025. Includes the former Golfsmith, Top-Flite, Maxfli, and MacGregor Golf.
G.R. Kinney Company	North America	Shoe Store	Division	1894–1998	Purchased in 1963. Foot Locker originally was part of the G. R. Kinney division before the organisation of the Woolworth Athletic Group division.
Going to the Game	North America	Sports memorabilia	Division	1990s	
J. Brannam	North America	Clothing	Division	1979–c. 1997	Short for "Just Brand Names"
Kids Foot Locker	North America	Shoe Stores	Division	1974–Present	
Lady Foot Locker	North America	Women's athletic stores	Division	1974–Present	
Northern Elements	North America	Clothing stores	Division	1990s	
Northern Getaway	North America	Clothing stores	Division	1990s	
Warehouse Shoe Sale	North America	Athletic Shoes	Division	2021-Present	Acquired by Foot Locker, Inc in 2021.
Northern Reflections	North America	Outerwear stores	Division	1990s–Present	Canadian chain
Northern Traditions	North America	Women's business wear	Division	1990s	Canadian chain
Red Grille	North America	Restaurant	Division	1960s–1997	Cafeteria style restaurant
Rx Place	North America	Discount drug store	Division	1980s-1990s	
San Francisco Music Box Company	North America	Music box stores	Division	1978–1999	Company was sold by Venator.
Six:02	North America	Women's athletic wear	Division	2012–Present	Upscale women's athletic store started in 2012.
Venator Group	North America	Shoe Store	Successor	1997–2001	Renamed from F. W. Woolworth Company
Woolco	North America	Discount store	Division	1962–1994	Became Walmart Canada
Worth Mart	North America	Discount store	Division	1960s	More down-market than Woolco
2 Entertain	Europe	Home Video	Spin-off joint venture	2004–Present	Partner with BBC
Alworths	Europe	General merchandise	Spin-off successor	2009–2011	18 stores, mostly taken over by Poundstretcher
B&Q	Europe	Home improvement	Spin-off	1969–Present	Stands for "Block & Quayle"
Bertram Books	Europe	Book Wholesaler	Spin-off Division	1971–Present	Bought by Smiths News
Chad Valley	Europe	Toy Brand	Spin-off Brand	1800s–Present	Purchased by Home Retail Group, now owned by Sainsbury’s
Embassy Records	Europe	Record Label	Joint venture	1954–1965	Partner with Oriole Records
Entertainment UK	Europe	Distributor	Division	1988–2009	Renamed from Record Merchandisers Limited
Freedom Sportsline	Europe	Shoes	Successor Division	c. 2001–Present	British division does business as "Foot Locker"
F. W. Woolworth Ireland	Europe	Retail	Spin-off	1914–1984	Former Irish division of F. W. Woolworth plc (later called Woolworths)
Kingfisher	Europe	Successor Parent company	Retailer	1982–Present	Became Woolworth Holdings but then spun it off in 2001
Ladybird	Europe	Division Brand	Children's Clothing	1938–Present	Now part of Shop Direct Group
Record Merchandisers Limited	Europe	Record Label	Division	1966–1988	Founded by EMI Records
Retail Company of Germany	Europe	Department	Division	1927–1998	German division that became Woolworth GmbH
Wellchester (originally Wellworths)	Europe	Stationery	Spin-off successor	2009–2012	1 store in Dorchester
Woolworth GmbH	Europe	Department	Spin-Off	1998–Present	Formerly Retail Company of Germany, founded in 1927
Woolworths Group	Europe	Retail	Spin-off	1909–2009	Former British division
Woolworth (Cyprus)	Europe	Department	Division Spin-off	1950s–2003	Now a Debenhams franchise
Woolworth (Cyprus) Properties	Europe	Retail Developer	Spin-off	2005–Present	
Woolworths.co.uk	Europe	Online retailer	Spin-off successor	2009–2015	Now part of Shop Direct Group
Runners Point	Europe	Athletic Clothing	Division	2013–Present	German athletic stores acquired by Foot Locker in 2013.
Atmos	Asia	Athletic Clothing	Division	2021-present	Japanese athletic stores acquired by Foot Locker in 2021.
South African namesake
Woolworths South Africa	Africa	Department	Namesake	1931–Present	Named after Woolworth's without any financial connection
Café W	Africa	Restaurant	Namesake Division	2000s–Present	
Country Road	Oceania	Clothing Store	Namesake Division	1998–Present	Owned by Woolworths South Africa
Australian namesake
Woolworths Group (Australia)	Oceania	Retail company	Namesake	1924–Present	Named after Woolworth's without any financial connection
Australian Leisure and Hospitality Group	Oceania	Hotel Chain	Namesake Division	1974–Present	
Big W	Oceania	Discount	Namesake Division	1976–Present	
BWS	Oceania	Liquor	Namesake Division	2001–Present	Stands for Beer, Wine & Spirits, spun-off into Endeavour Group 2021
Caltex Safeway	Oceania	Petrol station	Namesake Joint venture	2003–2014	Rebranded Caltex Woolworths in 2014
Caltex Woolworths	Oceania	Petrol station	Namesake Joint venture	2003–Present	Partner with Caltex
Countdown	Oceania	Grocery	Namesake Division	1981–2005	Under Progressive Enterprises
Dan Murphy's	Oceania	Liquor	Namesake acquisition	1878–Present	Purchased 1998 by Woolworths, spun-off into Endeavour Group 2021
Dick Smith	Oceania	Consumer electronics	Namesake acquisition	1968–Present	Woolworth bought from Dick Smith in 1980, sold to Anchorage Capital Partners on 26 November 2012, and was listed on the Australian Securities Exchange on 4 December 2013
Everyday Rewards	Oceania	Loyalty program	Namesake division	2007–Present	
Flemings	Oceania	Grocery	Namesake acquisition	1930–Present	Purchased by Woolworth Limited in 1960
Food For Less	Oceania	Grocery	Namesake acquisition	c. 1980s–Present	Discount Australian division
Foodtown	Oceania	Grocery	Namesake division	1958–Present	Part of Progressive Enterprises
Masters Home Improvement	Oceania	Grocery	Joint venture with Lowe's	2011–Present	
Progressive Enterprises	Oceania	Grocery	Spin-off then acquisition	1949–Present	Now the New Zealand division of Woolworth Group (Australia)
Safeway	Oceania	Grocery	Namesake acquisition	1963–2014	Being converted to Woolworths brand
Tandy	Oceania	Consumer electronics	Namesake acquisition	1973–Present	Woolworth purchased in 2001
Thomas Dux	Oceania	Grocery	Namesake division	2008–Present	Upscale health oriented chain
Woolworths @ Gull	Oceania	Petrol station	Joint venture with Gull Petroleum	2001–Present	
Woolworths (New Zealand)	Oceania	Grocery	Namesake Division	1929–Present	Part of Woolworths Group (Australia)
Woolworths Petrol	Oceania	Petrol station	Namesake Division	1996–2003	Replaced by Caltex Woolworths joint venture
Woolworths	Oceania	Grocery	Namesake division	1929–Present	Largest grocer in Australia

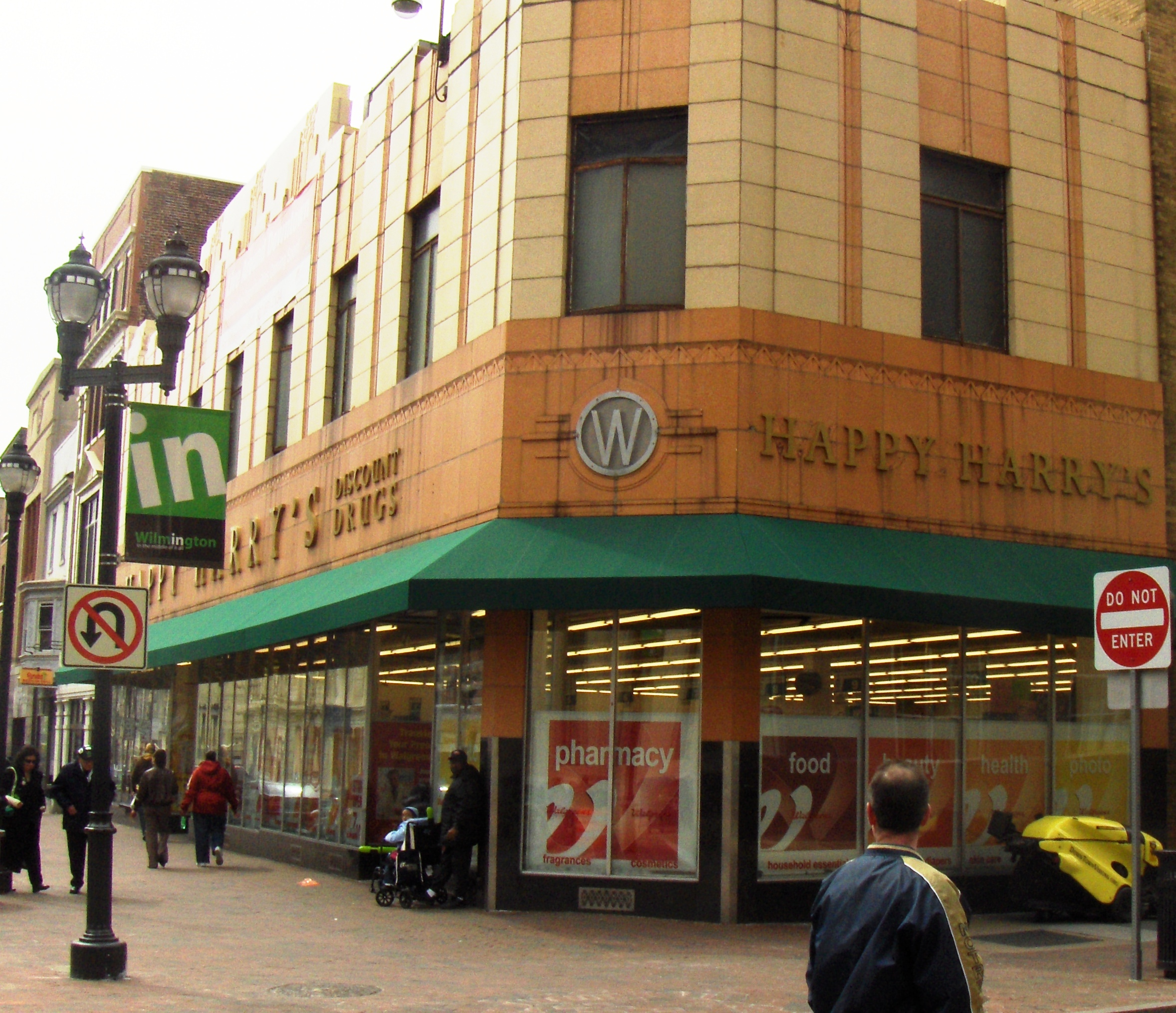
F. W. Woolworth Company store in America

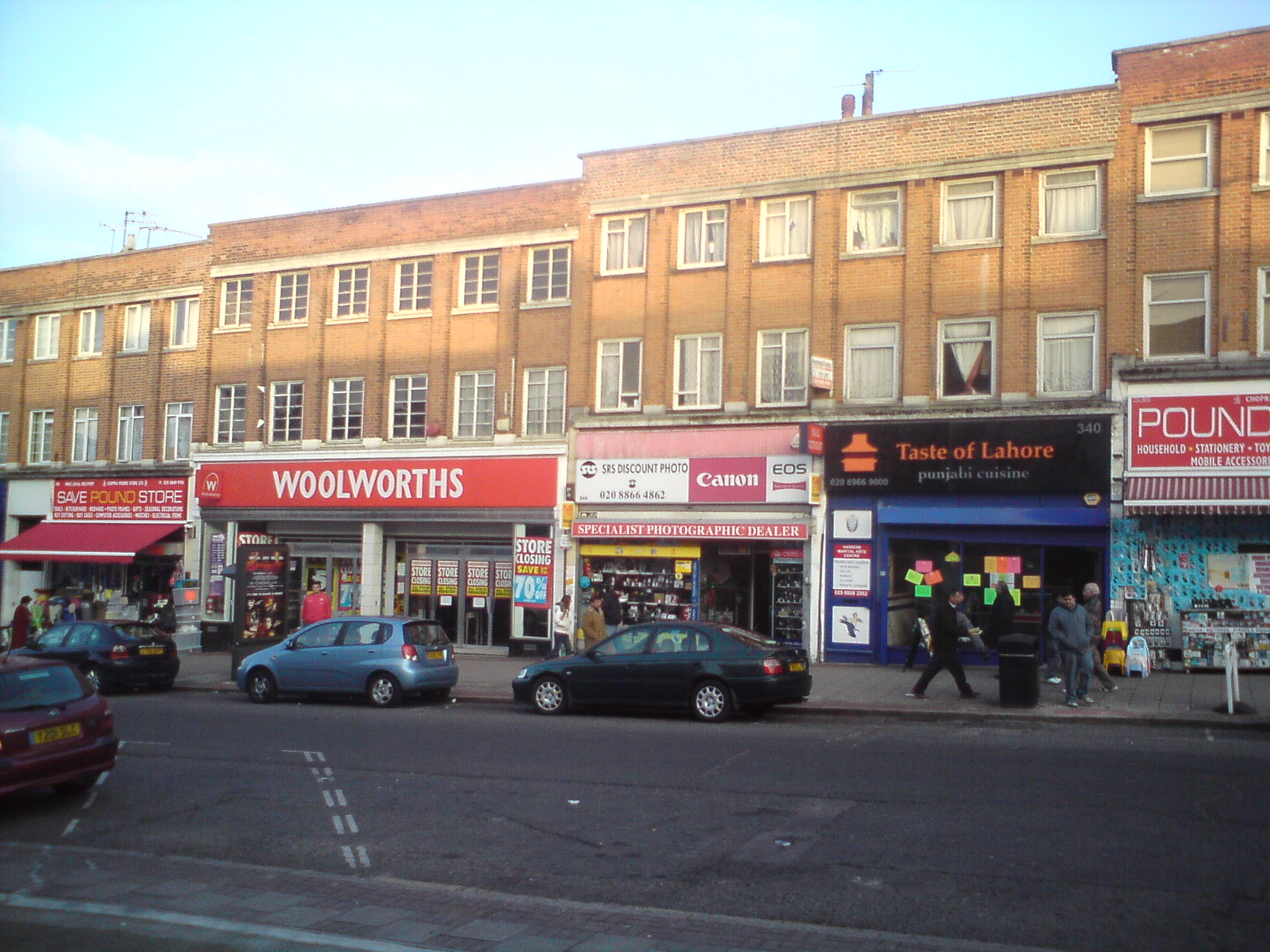
Woolworths Group British store

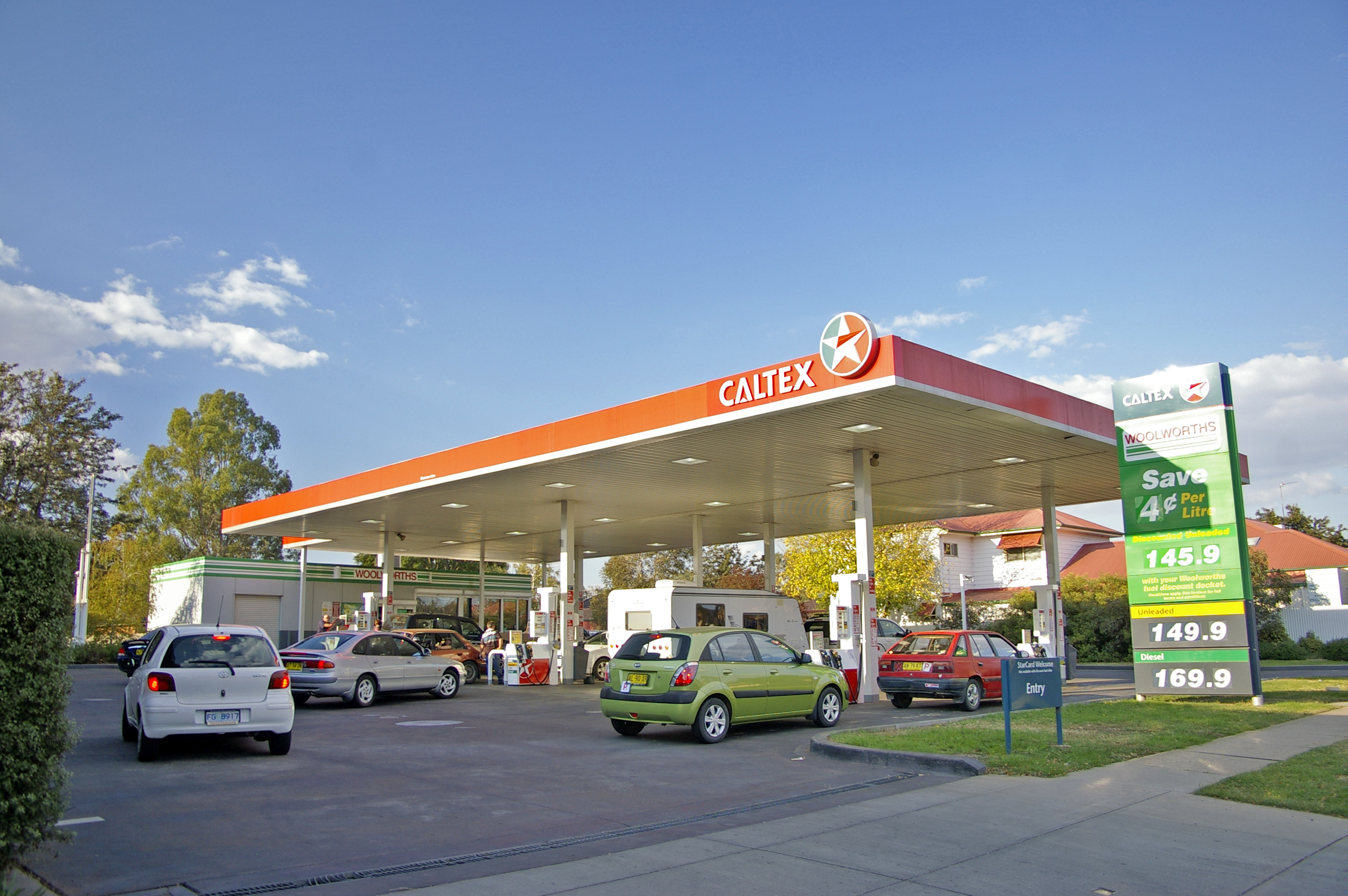
Caltex Woolworths in Australia

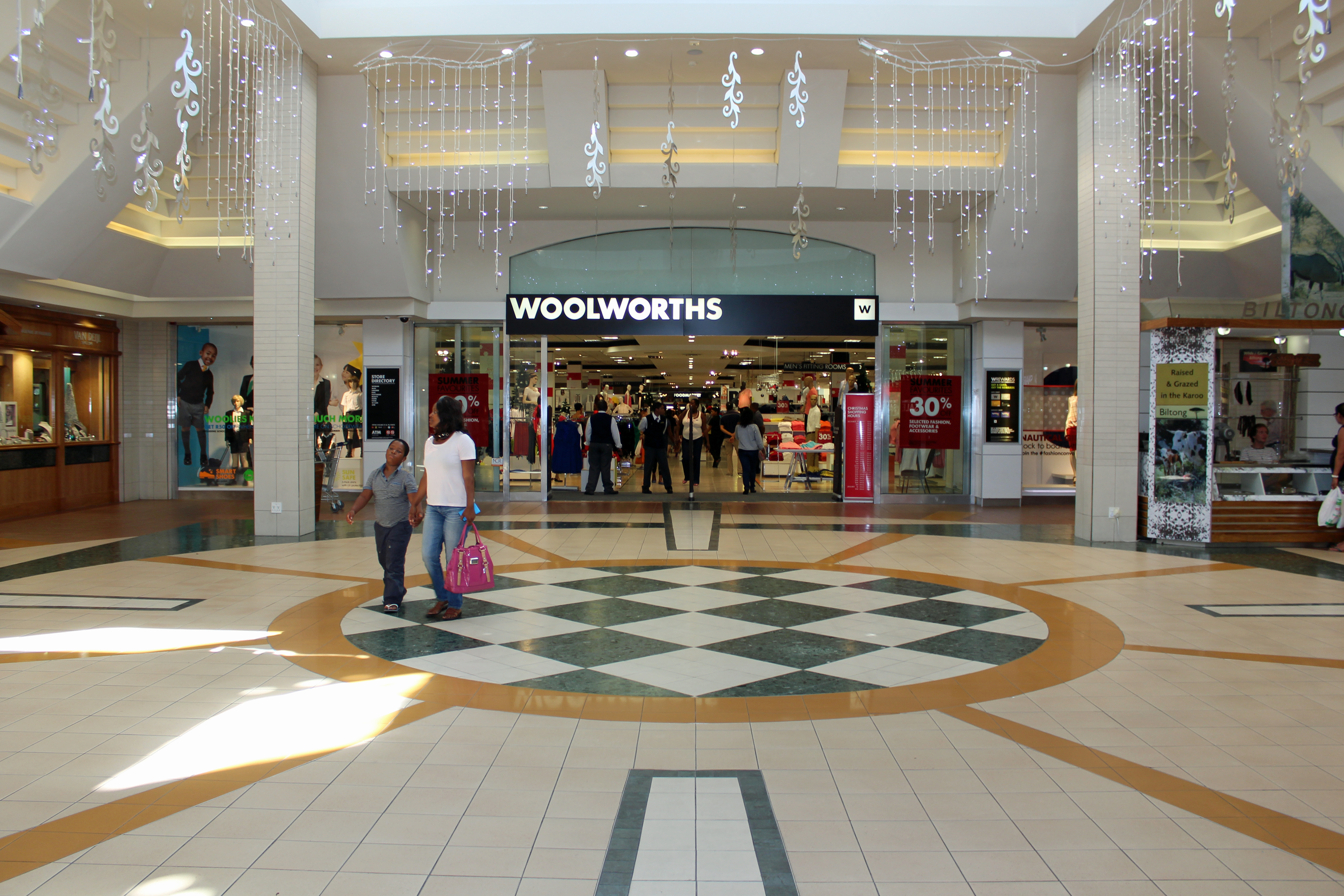
Woolworths South Africa store
