= Woolworth (disambiguation) =

Woolworth (The F. W. Woolworth Company) was the original US-based chain of "five and dime" (5¢ and 10¢) stores, later a department store chain and conglomerate.

Woolworth, Woolworth's, Woolworths, Woolies, or Woollies may also refer to:

== Retailers ==
=== Australia and New Zealand ===
- Woolworths Group, an Australian multinational retail and financial services company, named after the US business but otherwise unrelated to it

- Woolworths (Australia), supermarket chain owned by Woolworths Group
- Woolworths (New Zealand), supermarket chain owned by Woolworths Group

=== Barbados ===
- Woolworth (Barbados), variety retail chain, originally owned by Woolworth in the United Kingdom

=== Cyprus ===
- Woolworth (Cyprus), variety retail chain, originally owned by Woolworth in the United Kingdom, stopped trading as a retailer in 2003, now a real estate developer

=== Europe ===
- Woolworth (Europe), variety retail chain, originally owned by Woolworth in the United States, operates throughout Germany, Poland, Austria, the Czech Republic and Slovakia

=== Jamaica ===
- Woolworth (Jamaica), variety retail chain, originally owned by Woolworth in the United Kingdom

=== Mexico ===
- Woolworth (Mexico), variety retail chain, originally owned by Woolworth in the United States

=== South Africa ===
- Woolworths (South Africa), supermarket and variety retail chain

=== United Kingdom and Ireland ===
- Woolworths (United Kingdom), variety retail chain, originally owned by Woolworth in the United States, went defunct in 2009
- Woolworth (Ireland), variety retail chain, originally owned by Woolworth in the United States, went defunct in 1984

== People ==
- Alan Woolworth (1924–2014), American archaeologist
- Charles Sumner Woolworth (1856–1947), American retail entrepreneur, company partner and younger brother of Frank
- Frank Winfield Woolworth (1852–1919), American retail entrepreneur, founder of the company that bore his name
- Michael Woolworth (born 1960), American artist/printer

== Buildings ==
- Woolworth Estate, Glen Cove, New York, U.S., the historic estate of Frank Winfield Woolworth

== Other uses ==
- Escort carrier, also called a "Woolworth Carrier" by the Royal Navy
- FP-45 Liberator, nicknamed the "Woolworth gun" due to its low quality
- Woolworth, Mississippi, a ghost town in Lincoln County, Mississippi, U.S.

== Lists ==
- List of Woolworth buildings
- List of Woolworth divisions and namesakes
