= Big W (United Kingdom) =

Former large format chain of megastores

- Type: Subsidiary of Woolworths
- Genre: Large Format Store
- Predecessors: Woolco
- Founded: 1998; 28 years ago
- Defunct: 2004; 22 years ago
- Fate: Format abandoned, re-branded as Woolworths
- Successors: Woolworths; Woolies online
- Headquarters: England, United Kingdom
- Number of locations: 21
- Area served: United Kingdom
- Products: General merchandise
- Owner: Kingfisher (1998–01); Woolworths (2001–2004)
- Parent: Woolworths Group
- Subsidiaries: Out-of-Town Stores
- Website: bigw.co.uk (Archive of former site from late 2003)

Big W (later named Woolworths Big W) was a British variety store chain operated by the Woolworths Group. It was created in 1998 by the Kingfisher Group as a store format that would combine the best of their then-owned chains; Comet, B&Q, Superdrug and Woolworths, under one roof. Big W stores were found in Retail parks in contrast to the High Street format standard Woolworths stores were located within.

While initially successful, the split-up of the Kingfisher Group into a DIY-focused business led to trouble for the chain when it was included in the 2001 split of the General Merchandise division, resulting in low sales and poor financial results. Three years later, Woolworths announced that the Big W format would be scrapped in favour of smaller out-of-town stores branded under its own name, with some being sold to supermarket chains Asda and Tesco.

== History ==
=== Prior experience ===
Before the formation of Big W, Woolworths had already experimented in the out-of-town market under its former parent, the F. W. Woolworth Company. F.W. Woolworth operated a chain of out-of-town department stores in the United States named Woolco; and in 1967 had expanded the chain to the United Kingdom with the opening of a store in Oadby, Leicestershire in 1967. The store was 63,000 square feet (5,900 m^{2}) and offered many products like groceries, fashion and household products under one roof; being the first out-of-town store of its type in the country. By the 1970s, the company operated twelve stores under the brand.

When the F.W. Woolworth Company spun off the British Woolworth chain into Woolworth Holdings PLC in 1983, Woolco UK was also included in the sale. By 1986, the company had exited the out-of-town business and sold all Woolco stores to Gateway, which then sold the stores to Asda in 1988.

=== Creation of Big W ===
In 1980, The F.W. Woolworth Company purchased the Southampton-based DIY chain B&Q, which at its peak had 26 stores. In 1983, Woolworth's operations in the United Kingdom underwent a management buyout from their former parent company, initially as Paternoster Stores, before becoming Woolworth Holdings PLC. Under the new owners, the company went on to purchase electrical retailer Comet in 1984 and beauty retailer Superdrug in 1987. With the large number of brands outside the general merchandise market, the company renamed itself to Kingfisher Group PLC in 1989.

As Kingfisher continued to expand, the company achieved a £100 million profit in 1997 and utilized most of the funds to refurbish existing Woolworths stores under three different subcategories: "City" stores, "Heartland" stores, and "Local" stores, which had proven to be very successful. The rest of the profit was used as part of a planned merger with supermarket chain Asda, which if the merger went through the two businesses would be to create an out-of-town megastore chain that would bring the best of Kingfisher and Asda in one roof. However, at the last minute, Walmart took over Asda.

After the failed merger, the CEO of Kingfisher Group, Sir Geoffrey Mulcahy, decided to go on his own in the out-of-town retail market and publicly revealed the large-format Big W chain in June 1998. Following the announcement, Headhunters at Kingfisher appointed Canadian-born Bob Hetherington to run the chain. Hetherington, who had prior experience as the chairman of the US version of Woolco, stated that the chain would be a "fun place to shop" and introduced the concept of "Retailment". The idea of "Retailment" was used to differentiate Big W from other retailers by providing in-store events that centred on a way where colleagues and families would have fun together, with an explicit focus on families. Events that would occur in stores included charity fundraisers, fancy dress parties, celebrity visits, music artist signings, and character greetings.

=== Initial success ===
Shortly after the announcement was made, a site in Edinburgh, Scotland, was chosen to be the first Big W location. Construction started in September 1998, and the large 100,000-square-foot (9,300 m^{2}) store opened in June 1999. The store was a huge success for Kingfisher, attracting 30,000 shoppers in its first three days. In addition to the already announced features, the Edinburgh store also contained a Burger King fast food outlet and a Peacocks clothing concession. Prior to the opening, Kingfisher announced on 30 April that they would purchase 10 stores from the Co-Op Homeworld retail chain, with most of the purchased stores being converted into Big Ws. In August, Kingfisher announced that the 80,000-square-foot (7,400 m^{2}) Co-Op Homeworld store in Coventry would reopen as a Big W store in October, becoming the second store to open and the first in England. Most of the former Co-Op Homeworld staff were hired to run the store, and its location in a busy area provided easy service. Following the opening, the former Rotherham and Bristol Co-Op Homeworlds would become the next stores to be converted for a March opening window, while nine more would open over the upcoming months.

In July 2000, the Coventry store trialed a packaged food range through a deal with the Booker Group, and in September, signed a three-year deal with Peacocks to sell their clothes in all Big W stores. On 12 October 2000, Kingfisher announced plans to extend Big W's grocery lineup by 2001, while beginning their first television advertising campaign for the chain, titled "Moving Home". At the same time, the next four stores in the chain, located in Stockton, Redruth, Bradford and Glasgow, would open between October and November. By December, Big W had become the first retail chain in the United Kingdom to break the £1 million barrier for a single week's sales for its Edinburgh and Coventry branches.

=== Fate ===
In September 2000, Kingfisher Group PLC announced that it would demerge, retaining the DIY and Electronics operations and splitting the general merchandise division, consisting of Woolworths, Superdrug, Big W, Woolworths General Store, MVC, Video Collection International, and Entertainment UK into a separately-traded company. Following the announcement, plans were made by the General Merchandise division to open 700 new stores, including 90 Big W stores, over the next few years after the split. By the summer of 2001, both Superdrug and the rest of the general merchandise division had restructured, with the former being sold to Dutch company Kruidvat as a public limited company while the latter became a publicly-traded company under the name of the Woolworths Group on 28 August.

With the loss of its major suppliers, the Big W chain was renamed to Woolworths Big W. New stores continued to open periodically, but as the years went on, it had proven that Big W was becoming very unprofitable for the company.

On 25 March 2004, Woolworths officially announced that the Big W format would be scrapped at a £41m loss for the company. Woolworths' chief executive, Trevor Bish-Jones, stated that the stores were "too big" for the company to operate and confirmed that most of the twenty-one sites would be downsized and rebranded under a new "Destination" format utilising the Woolworths name, that would focus more on standard out-of-town fare such as toys and party supplies as well as items that wouldn't be able to be sold in the regular high street stores. It was also unknown how this would affect the chain's supply deal with Peacocks. Eventually, it was announced that the seven stores in the chain that had planning permission to sell groceries would not be part of the restructuring and would be sold off.

On 9 January 2005, Woolworths sold the seven stores that sold groceries to Tesco and Asda, which also included a Big W store in Grimsby that never opened. The first two stores to gain the cut-down "Kids and Celebrations" strategy were the Norwich and Tamworth branches, with the other Big W stores following suit throughout 2005. Most of the new Woolworths stores had their gross internal floor area of the remaining sites reduced to an optimum trading size of around 40,000 to 50,000 square feet (3,700 to 4,600 m^{2}). While others, which kept their original store size, shared space with Peacocks or other concessions. An intended Big W site in Byker was the first to initially open as a Woolworths in 2004, while a newly-opened store in Hartcliffe, which opened in April 2005, was the first out-of-town Woolworths location to not originally open as a Big W.

Woolworths continued to periodically open out-of-town locations up until the company's collapse into administration in December 2008, after which all remaining stores were shuttered.

== Stores ==
Location	Opened	Closed	Notes
Aberdeen	25 July 2003	January 2005	Announcement of sale to Asda in January 2005.
Beckton	2002	2 January 2009	Also included a Peacocks outlet after conversion. After closure, the store was split up into various retail units, with the last portion of the building not being converted until 2016.
Bolton	17 August 2001	14 February 2005	Announcement of sale to Asda in January 2005. Reopened as such in May 2005.
Bradford	November 2000	January 2009	Located at the Victoria Centre, Girlington. Also included a Peacocks outlet after conversion. In June 2009, The Range took over the spot.
Catcliffe, Rotherham	March 2000	2008/2009	Located in the Catcliffe Retail Park. Also included a Peacocks outlet after conversion and a Specsavers opticians in 2008. Following a period of the building remaining empty, Boundary Mill Stores moved into the space in 2012 and currently trades as Boundary Outlet.
Coventry	29 October 1999	5 February 2005	It was the first store in the chain to sell food products. Announcement of sale to Tesco in January 2005, and reopened as a Tesco Extra in the middle of the year.
Coatbridge	2002	2005	One of the stores that was sold to Tesco. It reopened as a Tesco Extra later on in the year.
Edinburgh	June 1999	5 January 2009	The first store to open. Also included Peacocks and Burger King outlets. After remaining empty for almost four years, the building was converted into The Range in 2013.
Filton, Bristol	March 2000	2 January 2009	Located at the Abbey Wood Retail Park. Formerly traded as a Co-Op Homeworld. The store was downsized into two retail units in 2005, with Woolworths and Peacocks taking one half and TJ Hughes taking the other. After a long period of the building being empty after the closure of both stores (Woolworths in 2009, TJ Hughes in 2011), planning permission was granted in March 2012 to demolish the building and replace it with a new-built Asda store. which eventually came into action the following year, with Asda opening in November 2013, and a B&M Bargains opening in February 2014.
Glasgow	October/November 2000	2008/2009	Located in the Forge Retail Park. Also included a Peacocks outlet after conversion. In August 2011, Tesco announced they would convert the building into a Tesco Extra store, which opened a couple of months later. Tesco announced the closure of this store in January 2022 after a dispute with the lessor and its poor financial performance, closing at the end of April. In 2024, it was announced that Asian food chain Longdan would take over the space.
Grimsby	Never Opened	Never Opened	The store was constructed, built, and had hired staff, but never opened as a Big W. It was one of several stores that was purchased by Tesco and officially opened in May 2005 as a Tesco Extra.
Hull	2003	2005	Sold to Asda in 2005.
Loughborough	2004	2008/2009	Located at The Rushes Shopping Centre, it was one of the last Big W stores to open up. In February 2010, Tesco took over the building space.
Newport	2002	2008/2009	located on 28 East Retail Park. The store was downsized in 2005, being split into Woolworths and TJ Hughes. Following closure, the Woolworths portion reopened as The Range in 2011, while the TJ Hughes portion remained empty after its closure until becoming a B&M Home Store in November 2017.
Norwich	2002	2008/2009	Also included a Peacocks outlet after conversion and downsizing in 2005. Following the closure, Matalan took over the unit.
Redruth	October/November 2000	4 February 2005	Announcement of sale to Tesco in January 2005. Reopened as a Tesco Extra in July.
Small Heath, Birmingham	2001	2008/2009	Following its closure, planning permission was granted in April 2009 to convert the shop into seven smaller units. Following that, the area was renamed the St. Andrews Retail Park.
Stockton	13 October 2000	30 December 2008	Also included a Peacocks outlet after conversion. The store was converted into the Stockton Shopping Park in 2010, with the building forming four retail units, which currently consist of The Range, B&M Home Store, The Food Warehouse (Formerly Bargain Buys) and Smyths.
Tamworth	2001	26 April 2008	The store was downsized in 2005, with Woolworths taking over the left retail unit and Marks & Spencer taking over the right half. The store closed after Woolworths accepted an offer from Marks & Spencer for expansion, which the expanded M&S store opened in December 2008.

=== Woolworths Out-of-Town Stores ===
Location	Opened	Closed	Notes
Byker	2004	2008/2009	This store was originally constructed for the Big W format, but instead opened up as a 95,000-square-foot (8,800 m^{2}) Woolworths/Peacocks store in 2004. The store was converted to an Asda in 2010.
Cheetham Hill	2005	2 January 2009	Built as a Big W and used its style guide, but is likely never to have traded under that name. The retail unit was soon split up into a Matalan (Which closed in 2019) and a B&M Bargains. The former Matalan portion of the unit (and the adjacent USC unit) were merged to form an Evans Cycles store in 2021.
Newark-on-Trent	2005 or later	2008/2009	After closure, it was split up into several retail units.
Hartcliffe, Bristol	20 April 2005	2 January 2009	Opened as a testing ground for the Woolworths Out-of-Town format. The store reopened as "What" in 2009, and soon became The Range in 2011.
