= Westland Mall =

Westland Mall may refer to:

- Westland Mall (Florida), a shopping mall in Hialeah, Florida
- Westland Mall (Iowa), a shopping mall in West Burlington, Iowa
- Westland Mall (Ohio), a defunct shopping mall in Columbus, Ohio
- Westland Mall (Louisville), also known as Park Place Mall, a defunct mall in Louisville, Kentucky

== See also ==
- Westland Town Center, formerly Westland Mall, in Lakewood, Colorado
- Westland Center, a shopping mall in Fort Wayne, Indiana
- Westland Center, a shopping mall in Westland, Michigan
