= Our Price =

Chain of record stores from 1971 to 2004

OurPrice
- Trade name: Our Price; The Tape Revolution (1971-76); Our Price Records (1976–88); Our Price Music (1988-93)
- Industry: Entertainment & music retail
- Founded: 1971; 55 years ago in Finchley Road, London, England
- Defunct: 2004; 22 years ago (physical stores)
- Headquarters: Kensington High Street, United Kingdom
- Area served: United Kingdom
- Key people: Gary Nesbitt (founder); Edward Stollins (founder); Mike Isaacs (founder); Lee Skinner (last owner)
- Products: Music; DVDs; books; t-shirts
- Owner: Paul Harris
- Website: ourprice.com

Our Price is a British online music and entertainment retailer, and a former music and entertainment retail chain. The original retail chain traded in the United Kingdom and Ireland from 1971 to 2004. Its current online operations were launched in April 2024.

== History ==
Founded in 1971 by Gary Nesbitt, Edward Stollins and Mike Isaacs, their first store was located in London's Finchley Road. Until 1976, the first six stores were branded The Tape Revolution, by Bob Fowler of Fowler Coates Ltd and concentrated on selling the then-new compact cassette format and eight-track tapes.

From 1976, the chain was rebranded as Our Price Records, in response to higher demand for vinyl records over eight tracks or cassettes. In 1988, it was rebranded once again as Our Price Music, as record labels began to distribute the new CD format. In 1993, the by then three-hundred-store chain was renamed for the final time simply as Our Price.

The company's headquarters were in London, with an administrative office above the store on Kensington High Street and promotional offices in Wood Lane, White City. It initially focused on the rock album buyer, with regular imports of "cut-out" albums from the United States, a remainder and over-stock store on Charing Cross Road branded as Surplus Records, and a mail order business driven largely by advertising in the music press.

These markets fell away as the chain grew substantially from 1980 onwards, when the company purchased the existing chain Harlequin Records, which had numerous high street retail sites around the UK. Thereafter, rapid national expansion followed, with the 100th Our Price store opening in the Kings Road, Chelsea, the 200th at Stirling and the 300th in Brixton, South London.

=== Expansion ===
In the first half of the 1980s, Our Price established itself as the United Kingdom's second largest retailer of records and tapes (with Woolworths the largest). Brand recognition was driven by pun-rich radio advertising built around the "Get Down To Our Price" slogan, which later transferred to television featuring an animated carrier bag called Billy.

A sister chain, Our Price Video, was established to capitalise on the growing success of the new VHS tape format, and some towns eventually had two or three Our Price branded stores. Our Price Video was later rebranded under the Playhouse fascia, but failed to establish a significant market share in VHS sales, and it was wound up by then owners WH Smith in 1997.

The expansion of HMV by owners Thorn EMI in the late 1980s established a chain of newer, larger stores, which threatened and eventually overtook Our Price in popularity.

=== Flotation and sale to WH Smith ===
In 1984, Our Price was the first specialist music store to float on the London Stock Exchange. Two years later, it was acquired by WH Smith for £43 million, with Smith's Sound FX immediately absorbed into Our Price. Several members of senior management left the company in 1989 to create the rival MVC, which itself would eventually be bought by Woolworths.

In March 1994, WH Smith also bought a majority interest in Richard Branson's Virgin Music retail chain, a move which (with both Our Price and Virgin brands combined) would push them back ahead of HMV in market share. The next year, Virgin/Our Price increased profits by 10%. However, sales dropped by 3% in the year to May 1997, a contraction experienced throughout the industry.

Around this time, WH Smith opened 23 new Virgin Megastores, while closing nineteen Our Price branches. Even though Our Price had more outlets, over half the turnover then consisted of sales from stores trading under the Virgin brand with their larger footprints in locations with higher customer traffic.

In 1998, WH Smith sold Virgin/Our Price for £145 million to a division of the Virgin Group of companies in response to the stores losing £127 million in the year to date.

=== Sale to Virgin ===
After this takeover in 1998, the Virgin Group attempted to sell Our Price to its own management team, in a failed management buy-out. In August 2000, it was announced that the Our Price name would be dropped from 102 stores, mainly in South East England, in favour of the Virgin name, or VShop.

During the announcement, Our Price's commercial director, Neil Boote, told Billboard: "There has been no real investment in the vast majority of (Our Price) stores for a long, long time. Environmentally, they're a long way away from where we'd like to be." He added, "I'm sure Virgin believes that, if the VShop concept works, it has to have international potential. Frankly, Our Price was just too parochial a brand with no (particularly unique selling points). It epitomised the High Street record store of the '80s." Virgin had no immediate plans for the remaining 127 Our Price branded stores, until they saw how well the VShop chain would be received.

Five VShops reopened on 4 September 2000, located in Kensington, Ealing, Notting Hill Gate, Hammersmith and Chatham. VShops continued to stock the most popular CDs, but would concentrate equally on selling an expanded range of VHS video cassettes, DVDs, and Virgin branded mobile phone products, with Virgin Mobile taking up 25% of floor space.

These reconfigured stores removed the bulk of back catalogue CDs from display with the hope that customers could order these instore for home delivery through dedicated computer terminals, which Virgin called Find & Buy kiosks. The so-called 'clicks and mortar' strategy aimed to combine high street shopping with emerging internet shopping trends.

Virgin lost out to music and mobile phone competitors such as The Link, The Carphone Warehouse, HMV and MVC, while the increasing popularity of online shopping rendered the in-store ordering terminals redundant. Despite this, the Virgin Group continued to rebrand Our Price stores to VShop, and by April 2001, 100 Our Price branches had been converted, with the remaining 110 intended to be completed within the year. In addition, Virgin closed another 30 Our Price outlets between 1999 and 2001.

=== Sale to Brazin ===
In the early 2000s Virgin Group started to scale down its entertainment retail division in the United Kingdom. In September 2007, it sold its domestic Virgin Megastores in a management buy-out, and they were subsequently renamed Zavvi. The group sold their remaining 77 Our Price branded stores to Brazin Limited in October 2001.

Brazin was a major Australian entertainment retailer, which operated the 265 Sanity stores. It paid £2 for the Our Price stores and gained exclusive licence rights in Australia for Virgin Entertainment, which had last traded there nine years earlier, under the co-ownership of the Virgin Group and Blockbuster Inc. Virgin Megastores were opened in Melbourne and Sydney.

In addition to the nominal £2 paid, Brazin paid £900 million to the Virgin Group while getting that exact amount back from Virgin for tax efficiency purposes. Brazin's CEO Ian Duffell said that the music market in the United Kingdom was one of the strongest in the world that year, and he expected a "50 per cent increase in music revenues from day one." Further to the deal, Virgin would get 1% of all turnover in the stores, in conjunction with offering Brazin a £2 million loan facility. Brazin also made a commitment to restrict the size and proximity of its Sanity stores in the United Kingdom to ensure they did not pose a large competitive threat to Virgin's other music shops.

Early in 2002, Brazin experienced multiple delays in rebranding the Our Price stores due to difficulties with landlords, heritage listings, and negotiations with Railtrack. The company also moved the group's headquarters from the former Our Price central London offices to Alperton. The first rebranded Our Price store with Sanity's darker, urban look opened in London's Waterloo station on 23 April 2002, and the second opened at Paddington station on 9 May 2002, to positive customer reactions and strong sales. The Sanity/Our Price outlets were already starting to return on investments, and overall company operating profit rose to 32% in the year to 30 June 2002.

In July 2002, the Virgin Group announced that three VShops in Brixton, which had been Our Price's 300th shop, Hounslow and Notting Hill would be relaunched again as Virgin Megastore Xpress, with a move away from mobile phone retailing and return to a larger number of back catalogue products. Another two VShop outlets in Reading and Colchester were relaunched as Virgin Gamestores, selling both gaming software and hardware. By November that year, a total of 18 former VShops were converted to the Virgin Megastore Xpress fascia, increasing sales by around 30% year on year.

In November 2002, Brazin acquired the remaining 41 VShop music and mobile phone shops, all former Our Price outlets, from the Virgin Group for £2 million. These shops were added to the network already acquired, in addition to the new Sanity shops being established by Brazin. The first of these new outlets opened in October at Conswater, Northern Ireland, and in November at Southsea, followed by Waltham Cross. By January 2003, the Sanity/Our Price/VShop network had grown to approximately 130 stores across the country.

=== Sale to Primemist ===
In June 2003, OurPrice.co.uk was established as a comparison website. The site sold directly to customers online and through locations in third party stores, much like the Virgin find and buy service, and featured products which extended further than the music and entertainment industry..

In September 2003, even after increasing profitability across their store network, Brazin Limited sold all 118 stores of Sanity in the United Kingdom to Lee Skinner's investment company, Primemist Limited, for an estimated £9 million, citing higher expectations not met. At this stage, some shops were yet to be rebranded from Our Price; however, all VShop outlets were gone.

Primemist Limited immediately struggled to operate the chain due to major credit limit reductions from suppliers, and had no alternative but to enter into administration in December 2003. Buyers for the entire business, or individual parts of it, could not be found. By April 2004, administrators BDO Stoy Hayward had closed all the Our Price stores, resulting in the redundancy of 400 staff members.

The final Our Price to close, in Chesterfield, hosted a closing day party. All the chain's remaining stock was sold to the shops of Oxfam.

== Online retailer ==
Following the closure of the actual Our Price stores, Lee Skinner continued to own the Our Price trademarks through Our Price Entertainment Limited. The OurPrice.co.uk website continued, however it sold memorabilia for charities, and later closed down and remained dormant. In September 2009, Skinner sold the dormant Our Price trademarks to the HMV entertainment retailer. The OurPrice.com and OurPrice.co.uk web domains were later reopened and operated by Skinner and his group of friends – all ageing musicians and DJs, through a company called Our Price Records Limited. This company returned Our Price in various formats (such as charity auctions and selling merchandise), until April 2017 when Our Price Records Limited entered administration. In the mid-2010s, Skinner and his business partner Karen Ferreira, sold £3.6m of shares to small investors using cold-calling techniques. Investors suffered "substantial" losses and in 2020, the Financial Conduct Agency ruled that the shares has been sold using "misleading" and "unlawful" promotions. Skinner and Ferreira were ordered to pay restitution and banned from being company directors for 10 and 7 years respectively. Ferreira appealed against the ruling arguing that she was unaware of the deception and the Court of Appeal ruled in her favour and she no longer had to pay restitution. Skinner was declared bankrupt.

In June 2022, HMV sold the Our Price trademarks to a company called OurPrice.com Retail Limited, who had previously acquired the Our Price web domains. In April 2024, this company relaunched Our Price on the 30th April, the 20th anniversary of the final store closure. This online-only iteration of Our Price specialises in vinyl, merchandise and hi-fi audio equipment; with CDs, cassettes and books planned for future release.

== See also ==
Andy's Records
