= Ladybird (clothing) =

UK children's clothing brand

- Product type: Children's clothing
- Current owner: The Very Group
- Country: United Kingdom
- Markets: World
- Previous owners: Adolf Pasold & Son; Coats Viyella; Woolworths Group
- Website: Ladybird Brand; Ladybird Littlewoods
- Founded: 1938; 88 years ago
- Founder: Woolworths

Ladybird is a children's clothing brand in the UK and Ireland. It makes clothing and footwear for children aged 0 to 13 years old, and is owned by The Very Group, the UK's largest online retailer and parent company to household names Littlewoods and Very. Ladybird is one of the UK's best-known children's clothing brands, and has a long history dating back to the 18th century, with the Ladybird clothing name first appearing in 1938.

== History ==
Ladybird children's clothing first appeared on UK rails in 1938. The brand was owned by Adolf Pasold & Son, and sold through various well-known high street retailers, including Woolworths and Littlewoods. The name "Ladybird" was bought by Adolf Pasold & Son for just £5 from the Klinger Manufacturing Company because, according to legend, company founder Johannes Pasold had seen a ladybird in a dream when first starting the family firm in the 18th century.

The 1950s saw the first of the famous Ladybird press adverts, depicting Ladybirds in various human-like roles including scientists and computer boffins. In the early 1960s Ladybird clothing was being promoted by "The Ladybird Adventure Club", a full-colour comic strip in the children's magazine Swift. This was drawn by John Canning, and depicted the unlikely adventures of three Ladybird-wearing children who contrived to flash their "secret sign" (the Ladybird label) in every episode. By the 1960s, Ladybird had established itself as one of the UK's best-known names in childrenswear, although it was often sold under a different brand name in chain stores like Woolworths and Littlewoods. At this time, Ladybird effectively sold two ranges; in high street stores, the clothing was cheaper and more accessible to ordinary families; while in independent retailers, where the Ladybird brand name was used, the garments were generally more expensive, high quality pieces bought for Sunday best or by more well-off families.

In 1965, as British manufacturing started to decline, Ladybird merged with the world's largest sewing thread manufacturer Coats Patons. The deal gave Ladybird access to a huge range of wool and thread, opening up possibilities for new ranges. Coats Patons starting discussing the possibility of offering Woolworths exclusive rights over the Ladybird range in 1984. Sure enough, in 1986 the collaboration went ahead. Fourteen years later in 2000, Coats Viyella (as Coats Patons had become) sold the Ladybird name to Woolworths outright. Over the next few years, it became the favourite kids' clothing in the UK for under-5s, and was sold globally through stores in countries as diverse as China, Saudi Arabia, India and Malaysia.

However the Great Recession brought problems for parent company Woolworths, and the organisation went into administration in 2009 along with its Irish owned affiliate. Both Woolworths and Ladybird were rescued by Shop Direct and relaunched online in the same year.
