= Andy's Records =

- Industry: Entertainment & music retail
- Founded: 1969; 57 years ago in Cambridge, England
- Defunct: 2003; 23 years ago (physical stores)
- Headquarters: Bury St Edmunds, United Kingdom
- Area served: United Kingdom
- Key people: Andy Gray (founder)
- Products: Music; tickets; video; t-shirts
- Website: andysrecords.com

Andy's Records was a UK music retailer that traded from 1969 to 2003. Based in Bury St Edmunds, its roots were in nearby Felixstowe and Cambridge.

== History ==
Andy Gray started selling second-hand jukebox 45s and old 78 rpm records on Felixstowe Pier in 1969 and within five years had acquired a stall on Cambridge market. The market stall was successful, and in 1976 Gray opened his first retail shop in Mill Road, Cambridge. Initially, Andy's Records was well known for undercutting competitors by importing records from Europe at a bargain price and then passing the savings on to customers. The chain's expansion was slow and steady, and by the early 1980s the company had 12 stores across the east of England with two shops in Cambridge and others in Bury St Edmunds, King's Lynn, Peterborough, Haverhill, Colchester, Bedford, Lowestoft, Norwich and Ipswich.

By 1983 the company was trading as Andy's Records & Video, capitalising on the success of home video and the VHS and Betamax war. Gray listed the chain as a limited company, AHG Records. By this time, Gray's brother William (known as Billy) had become marketing director. Early advertising was often humorous and sometimes self-deprecating e.g. "Purveyors of fine music at cheapo prices". The company slogan around this time was "Possibly the greatest music stores in the world". This was replaced in the early 90s by "Where music matters" and again later on by "Where music REALLY matters".

The company, buoyed by the relatively new formats of VHS and CD, started to aggressively expand out of the Anglia region. Deciding that southern England was too expensive, the Gray brothers concentrated on opening stores in the Midlands and northern England. By the late 80s to early 90s, Andy's Records was fast becoming a well-known name on the UK High Street. It became the UK's largest independent music retailer in 1992, a title it retained for 10 years.

In 1993, the company won the prestigious Music Week Independent Retailer Award, and continued to win this award each year until 1999.

By the mid-1990s, the company had climbed into the Top 500 of UK companies and boasted a portfolio of more than 30 stores. By this time, Andy's Records had stopped selling cheap imports and started to compete with HMV and Virgin Megastores as a premium music retailer. The chain was too small to compete with these two, but too large to undercut competitors.

As late as November 1999, new stores were being opened with Leamington Spa its 40th.

== Decline and administration ==
In August 2000, it was announced that the Warrington and Doncaster stores were to close. With supermarkets getting even cheaper and increased competition from online stores, the chain started to flounder. When major competitors, such as HMV or Virgin, were present, their campaigns were better than Andy's, and recent chart albums were available at much lower prices, due to their bulk buying power. The chain's marketing was not up to the standard of the bigger chains.

After more store closures in 2001 and 2002, the chain was down to a roster of just under 30 stores and lost its claim to be the largest independent chain, being replaced by the up-and-coming Music Zone. Following a disappointing Christmas in 2002, Gray decided to go back to his roots and started to sell imports at cut-throat prices. Thousands of titles were slashed in price in January 2003, many normally retailing at £10.99 were reduced to £6.99, and £15.99/£16.99 became £10.99/£12.99. Around this time, the chain had a minor facelift with new styling and decor in most stores and new uniforms for staff.

The changes were too little, too late, and the company fell into administration in May 2003 with around 20 stores still trading.

All stores were put up for sale as a going concern. Both HMV and Virgin looked at stores but decided not to purchase. In July 2003, southern England-based music retailer Powerplay bought four stores (Lowestoft, Bedford, Hull and Loughborough) from the administrators. The company purchased a further two (Hereford and Worcester) in September 2003. All stores have since shut their doors and Powerplay now concentrates on online sales under the name Powerplay Direct although it has now opened a new store in Leicester.

After some immediate closures due to unprofitability, the chain was whittled down to 10 and started to sell all of its stock at discounted prices. All stores eventually shut on Saturday 13 September 2003, although the Beverley store was eventually bought by its management team. It stayed open till late 2005.

Andy Gray continues to run a successful reissue record label, BGO Records, from Bury St Edmunds (actually behind the old Andy's Records head office). The initials 'BGO' are shared with 'The Beat Goes On', the name of Andy's former second-hand, rare and deleted specialist shop in Cambridge. BGO is now the fourth largest reissue label in the UK and specialises in niche genres.

== See also ==
Our Price
