= Woolworth (Cyprus) =

Cypriot real estate developer

Woolworth (Cyprus) Properties PLC is a Cypriot real estate developer and property management company. The company was originally established as a retailer in 1974, which later became a subsidiary of the Shacolas Group in 1985, and divested of its retail assets in 2003.

Since 2005, the company has been publicly listed on the Cyprus Stock Exchange.

== History ==
=== Retailer (1974–2003) ===
The company began in 1974 with the opening of its flagship Woolworth store in Nicosia as a division of F. W. Woolworth & Co. Ltd (United Kingdom).

In 1985, the Cyprus operations were sold by the UK parent company to local entrepreneur Nicolas Shacolas (later awarded an OBE). Under Shacolas’ leadership, the business expanded rapidly across Cyprus, opening additional Woolworth stores that catered to a more upscale market. These stores featured designer clothing, luxury goods, perfumes, and food supermarket concessions, differentiating them from the original British Woolworths based around home goods and value.

In 2003, the retail operations of Woolworth Cyprus were acquired by Ermes Department Stores PLC, renaming the stores to Ermes. However, Shacolas Group retained ownership of the land, property management rights, and responsibilities for developing new commercial projects. In December 2004, the Ermes brand was phased out in favor of rebranding to Debenhams, through a franchise agreement. In March 2020, the Debenhams franchise agreement ended, and the stores were rebranded from Debenhams to ERA.

In May 2021, the former German division of F. W. Woolworth Company, Woolworth, registered the Woolworth name for retail purposes throughout the entire European Union, and were unchallenged in their application by Woolworth Cyprus Properties.

=== Real estate development (2003–present) ===
In 2005, F.W. Woolworth & Co (Cyprus) Ltd. went public on the Cyprus Stock Exchange as Woolworth (Cyprus) Properties PLC. The group would then become involved with a number of projects outside of retailing, including golf courses and resorts.
