= Woolco =

American discount department store

- Type: Subsidiary
- Industry: Discount department store
- Founded: 1962; 64 years ago (Columbus, Ohio, United States)
- Defunct: 1983 (United States); 1986 (United Kingdom); 1994 (Canada)
- Fate: United States; Liquidation; United Kingdom; Sold to Gateway; Canada; Most stores sold to Walmart Canada
- Successor: Woolworth/Asda (UK only); Walmart Canada (Canada only)
- Headquarters: Columbus, Ohio, United States
- Products: Clothing, footwear, bedding, furniture, jewelry, beauty products, electronics, toys, housewares
- Parent: F. W. Woolworth Company

Woolco was an American-based discount retail chain. It was founded in 1962 in Columbus, Ohio, by the F. W. Woolworth Company. It was a full-line discount department store unlike the five-and-dime Woolworth stores which operated at the time. At its peak, Woolco had hundreds of stores in the US, as well as in Canada and the United Kingdom.

While the American stores were closed in 1983, the chain remained active in Canada until it was sold in 1994 to rival Walmart, which was looking to enter the Canadian market. All of the former UK Woolco stores were sold by Kingfisher, which had bought the UK Woolworth business, to Gateway which subsequently sold them to Asda.

== History ==
=== Creation ===
The creation of Woolco coincided with the expansion of suburbia. Woolworth's flagship stores were still doing well, but the company wanted to tap into the growing discount department store market without diluting its dominant position in the variety store business. The first Woolco store was located in Columbus, Ohio and opened on June 6, 1962. By 1966, there were 18 in the United States and nine in Canada. Plans were for 30 stores to be added per year. This led to tremendous growth as over 300 Woolco stores opened up across North America by the mid-1970s. Some stores were converted from regular Woolworth stores, including the location at Westland Mall in West Burlington, Iowa.

The company experimented with both Woolco and a more downscale merchandising unit called Worth Mart in the mid-1960s. Woolco was the eventual winner with customers, and the Worth Mart stores were folded into Woolco's store base by the 1970s.

At the outset, Woolco stores were considered by the company to be "promotional department stores", with expanded product lines and other amenities not typically found at namesake Woolworth stores.

Many locations contained Red Grille restaurants, a cafeteria-style outlet, and the food areas sold popcorn, real milkshakes, and other food.

A number of Woolco stores were opened in the United Kingdom during the same period. One of which opened in Bournemouth on 29 October 1968; in 1970, it was the largest store on one floor in Britain, with an area of 114,000 square feet and parking space for 1,250 cars.

In November 1971, four new stores were opened simultaneously across Canada (including at Marlborough Mall) bringing the total in that country to 47.

=== Demise ===
The typical Woolco store was well over 100,000 square feet (9,300 m^{2}), which was quite large for a discount store of that era. Many of its departments (e.g., shoes and jewelry) were leased to third-party operators, a common practice among early discounters.

Starting in the late 1970s, Woolworth enacted a cost-saving plan for Woolco that included a reduction in floor space for the largest locations, the elimination of most leased departments and an expansion into smaller markets with stores as small as 60,000 square feet (5,600 m^{2}). During this period, the excess space in some larger Woolco stores went to Woolworth-owned J. Brannam.

J. Brannam, short for "Just Brand Names", was an off-price clothing retailer owned by F.W. Woolworth. Plans for the chain were first made public via a press release in July 1979, which stated the chain would open its first locations in the Oklahoma City and Dallas metro markets, in which there would be three and five locations in each area respectively. All eight of these prototype J. Brannam locations opened on October 24, 1979. Rapid expansion began; by its peak in 1982, the chain had stores as far west as Arizona and as far east as North Carolina. This expansion soon proved too strenuous for the chain, and all locations were shuttered by December 1985, citing "increased competition in discount retailing".

By 1979, it became clear that the earlier cost-saving plan would not be enough to save Woolco from failure, so Woolworth combined the discount store operating unit with its variety stores and began to close stores in unprofitable markets including Chicago.

=== Closure ===
On September 24, 1982, Woolco announced it would close all of its United States stores. The final Woolco store to have a grand opening in the U.S. was the September 29, 1982 launch of the Luling, Louisiana location at St. Charles Plaza store, which was five days after the chain's announcement of closing all stores. By January 1983, all 336 stores were shuttered. Woolco's inventory was valued at approximately $1 billion, making Woolco's liquidation the largest in United States history at the time. However, the Canadian division of approximately 120 stores remained open.

In 1982, the UK stores were spun off along with the British Woolworths chain in the same year. In 1986, Woolworths sold the Woolco stores to Gateway, exiting them out of their ownership. Gateway then soon sold the stores again to Asda in 1988. In the UK, Woolworths' then-parent company Kingfisher plc attempted to revive the style of Woolco with the Big W chain in 1999, which was successful but suffered when Woolworths split into its own company in 2001, and in 2004, Woolworths Group PLC scrapped the Big W chain and sold some of the stores to supermarket chains Asda and Tesco. Woolworths rebranded the Big W stores they kept under their own name and they remained until Woolworths' administration in 2008.

In 1990, 26 Woolworth stores in Canada were converted to Woolco because of their larger size. On January 14, 1994, in order to repay the $1.7 billion debt incurred from international specialty store expansion, the Woolworth Corporation sold most of the Woolco Canada stores to Walmart. Walmart did not acquire the Woolco stores that were either unionized or had downtown locations. Some Woolco stores were sold and re-opened as Zellers stores; when Zellers liquidated, some of those stores were later sold to Target Canada, which ceased operations itself in 2015 following liquidation.

=== Canada ===
In a smaller, less crowded retail market, Woolco had a bigger impact in Canada than it did in the US. There were 160 Woolco stores in Canada at dissolution, the chain having survived another 11 years in Canada after the US closure and before being bought out by Walmart Canada. They were so well known that Canadian songwriters Leon Dubinsky and Max MacDonald even wrote a popular song called "Working at the Woolco Manager Trainee Blues" (1977). During the 1970s and 1980s, the Canadian stores were well known for their monthly "$1.44 Days", wherein numerous items were sold at a price of $1.44 CAD. Competitors Woodward's and Eaton's ran "$1.49 Days" usually the first Monday each month. Most stores also contained an automotive and tire service department. Most stores in Canada had an in-store restaurant section. These restaurants were named Red Grille or Strawberry Fair Cafeteria, except in the province of Quebec where they were named Café Rouge or Moisson d'Or.
