= Woolworth (Barbados) =

Barbados retailer

- Founded: 1953; 73 years ago
- Website: woolworth.bb

Woolworth Barbados is a Barbadian retailer founded in 1953, separated from Woolworths United Kingdom in 1982.
