= Westland Mall (Iowa) =

- Location: West Burlington, Iowa, United States
- Coordinates: 40.8211°N 91.1674°W
- Opened: 1977
- Developer: General Growth Properties
- Owner: 4th Dimension Properties
- Num. of stores: 33
- Num. of anchor tenants: 4 (2 open, 2 vacant)
- Floor area: 338,000 sq ft (31,400 m^{2})
- Floors: 1
- Public transit: Burlington Urban Service

Westland Mall is an enclosed shopping mall in West Burlington, Iowa. Opened in 1977, the mall's anchor stores are Burlington Warehouse Bargains and Westland Theatre. There are 2 vacant anchor stores that were once Marshalls and Younkers. It is owned by 4th Dimension Properties.

== History ==
General Growth Properties began building Westland Mall in 1976. Original tenants included JCPenney, Younkers, Woolworth, Kirlin's Hallmark, County Seat, Karmelkorn, Bresler's Ice Cream, and Osco Drug. The mall opened for business on March 30, 1977, comprising more than 40 stores. In 1981, Woolworth converted the store to its Woolco division, before closing it in 1983. The space was later occupied by a furniture store.

L&H Realty bought the mall in 1998, and sold it to GK Development in 2004. Marshalls opened an anchor store at the mall in October 2013. In 2015, JCPenney announced that it would close its Westland Mall store along with 38 other stores in the United States, The store closed in spring 2015, in 2018 Younkers closed due to The Bon Ton bankruptcy.

In the former Hallmark and FYE locations in the mall, Sears Hometown Store opened up there in April 2022 and closed before the end of the year. Due to wide closure of all Sears Hometown store locations.

In August 2023 it was announced Marshalls would be leaving the mall to move to an open space of a former Walmart.

In January 2024, the Westland Mall Facebook Page announced that 4th Dimension Properties acquired the Westland Mall and announced that they will work to attract new businesses to add to the current list of businesses.
