= Music and Video Club =

British chain of music and video shops

Music and Video Club (MVC)
- Type: Private
- Industry: Entertainment retail, Record store
- Founded: 1989
- Defunct: 2006
- Fate: Administration
- Headquarters: London, United Kingdom
- Number of locations: 82, (73 at time of administration)
- Area served: United Kingdom
- Products: VHS, DVD, music, video games
- Owner: Kingfisher Group (1993–01); Woolworths Group (2001-05); Argyle Partners (2005–06)
- Number of employees: 700

Music and Video Club (MVC) was a British entertainment retailer, founded in 1989.

At its peak, the company operated 82 stores in the United Kingdom, and also sold products over the internet in its later years. The company closed in January 2006 after entering administration.

== History ==
Music and Video Club (MVC) was founded by former directors of Our Price, another entertainment retailer, who left after it was purchased by WHSmith.

MVC took over two video rental stores called 'Titles' in Hendon and Colchester, with its unique selling strategy being centred around offering discounted prices for members, using a dual pricing system whereby members obtained a membership card for a small fee. However, its strategy of locating off the high street to save rental costs led to reduced footfall and as competitors began to reduce CD, video and multimedia prices, this price advantage was eroded over time. It belatedly attempted to locate newer outlets in prime locations but MVC had missed its opportunity.

It was bought by Kingfisher plc in 1993 and was included as part of the spin-off of their merchandising division as the Woolworths Group in 2001.

=== Sale and Collapse ===
On 23 March 2005, Woolworths Group announced that they would sell the MVC chain and 67 stores, while closing 14 profit-lossing branches. In June, Music Zone was interested in purchasing MVC, although the deal later fell through. On August 5, MVC was sold for £5.5 million to an investment group led by Argyll Partners.

Despite the new ownership, MVC struggled in a saturated market led by supermarkets and rival chains. On 20 December, Argyll Partners agreed to sell a selection of MVC stores to Music Zone for an undisclosed amount. The following day, MVC announced that they had entered administration with Kroll. Kroll completed the Music Zone deal by 4 January 2006. The remaining 23 stores would permemently close shortly after. The store's website closed at the beginning of February.

Music Zone would also struggle with the ex-MVC stores under its path, and on 5 January 2007 the chain announced they had also collapsed into administration. 67 of their stores, including some former MVC stores, were purchased by Fopp in February. Fopp, however, also subsequently entered administration in June 2007, with HMV purchasing the brand and a small selection of stores. As of July 2025, Fopp has six stores.
