= Entertainment UK =

Defunct British retail supply and distribution company (1966-2009)

- Formerly: Record Merchandisers Ltd
- Type: Private
- Industry: Retail supply and distribution
- Predecessor: EMI Music Publishing
- Founded: 1966; 60 years ago (as Record Merchandisers Ltd)
- Founder: EMI Music Publishing
- Defunct: 2009; 17 years ago
- Fate: Dissolved
- Successor: EMI Music Publishing; 2 Entertain
- Headquarters: Middlesex, UK
- Area served: UK
- Key people: Mike Thomas, IT and Business Development Director, Graham Barnetson, Sales & Marketing Director, Paul Ludlam, Trading Director
- Products: Books; Consoles; DVDs; Games; Music
- Revenue: £1.22bn (2008)
- Net income: £12.3m (2008)
- Owner: Woolworths (United Kingdom); 2 Entertain; Sony Music Publishing
- Number of employees: 375
- Parent: Woolworths Group; 2 Entertain; EMI Music Publishing
- Website: www.entuk.co.uk

Entertainment UK Limited (EUK) was a retail supply and distribution company and a wholly owned subsidiary of Woolworths Group. The company, and Woolworths plc, entered administration with Deloitte on 26 November 2008. EUK claimed to have had a turnover in excess of £1.4 billion per annum, and over 160,000 lines of products.

== History ==
Entertainment UK was founded as Record Merchandisers Limited in 1966 by EMI Music Publishing to distribute music to non-specialist retailers. It later became a joint venture between a number of record companies. Woolworths became Entertainment UK's largest customer and in 1986 Record Merchandisers Limited was acquired by Kingfisher plc. In 1988, Record Merchandisers Limited changed its name to Entertainment UK (EUK).

EUK became the property of Woolworths Group after the demerger from parent company Kingfisher in 2001. In 2006, Woolworths Group acquired Total Home Entertainment Distribution Limited (THE) to form part of EUK division. In November 2007 EUK acquired Bertram Books, a major book wholesaler and distributor.

=== Administration ===
EUK was the most profitable arm of Woolworths Group and it was this portion of the business that the management hoped to retain when it attempted to divest itself of its retail arm and its liabilities. However, with the failure of the restructuring talks EUK went into administration with its parent company on the 28 November and immediately stopped deliveries. On 12 December 2008, 700 staff were made redundant. EUK continued to operate with a reduced workforce of 375. On 14 January 2009, Deloitte announced a further reduction of 134 employees across all 4 of EUK's remaining sites, and is continuing in its efforts to sell any remaining stock within the warehouses in order to service the debt.

Following a number of "active discussions" with prospective suitors of Bertram Books, the administrators announced the sale of the company to Smiths News.

On 13 March 2009, Gardners Books based in Eastbourne, East Sussex visited Entertainment UK's Greenford Auriol Drive site for talks about a possible purchase of the lease to the automated warehouse, and at one point it was believed that a deal totalling £1,500,000 was struck to purchase the lease.

The Entertainment UK business was eventually officially dissolved on 20 April 2015.

== Awards and acclaims ==
In 2005 and 2006, Entertainment UK was given 'The European Supply Chain Excellence' and 'The Global Retail Technology Forum' awards respectively in addition to the 'Best Retail Buying Team' at 2006 MCV Industry Excellence Awards.

== Operations ==
Entertainment UK supplied many major retailers and signed new partnerships with Zavvi (formerly Virgin Megastores) and Asda in 2007. Other notable customers included Morrisons, Sainsbury's, W H Smith, Tesco and the Borders entertainment back catalogue. It also ran two Amazon Marketplace stores on Amazon.co.uk; "market plus", run by the offshore subsidiary Entertainment Plus (Guernsey) Ltd, and "direct-offers", the UK based stock clearance arm of Entertainment UK.

As a consequence of EUK entering administration, Zavvi became unable to source stock on favourable terms from other supplies. It entered administration on 24 December 2008.
