= Woolworth (Ireland) =

Former Irish retail chain

- Company type: Retail chain
- Predecessor: F. W. Woolworth Company
- Founded: 23 April 1914; 112 years ago
- Defunct: 6 October 1984; 41 years ago
- Successor: Woolworths Group (1909–2009)
- Owner: Woolworth GmbH (trademarks)

Woolworth was a variety retail chain, founded in 1914 by the American FW Woolworth Company. Woolworth operated in the Republic of Ireland until 1984, and in Northern Ireland until 2009.

During the 70 years of operations, Woolworth established itself at the heart of Irish shopping and stores sourced about 80% of their range locally, offering Irish equivalents to the items usually carried in Woolworth stores in Britain.

In November 2008, the Woolworths chain collapsed and closed its final stores by January 2009. The defunct brand was acquired by The Very Group. In July 2021, the former German division of F.W. Woolworth Company, Woolworth, purchased the defunct Irish Woolworth brand, trademarks and intellectual property from The Very Group for an undisclosed sum.

== History ==
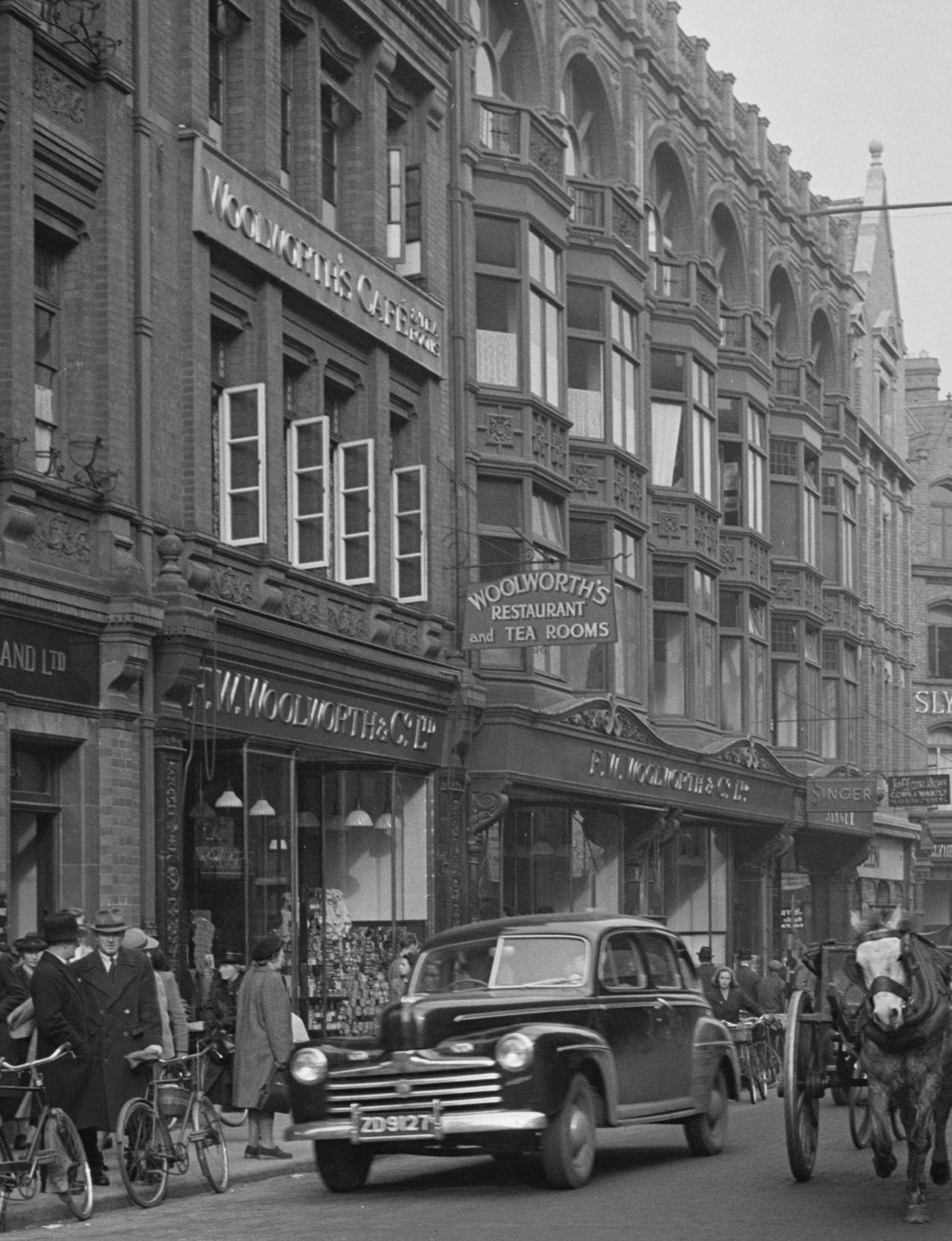
Woolworth on Grafton Street in 1946

The first F. W. Woolworth store in Ireland opened on 23 April 1914 on Grafton Street in Dublin. Plans for an outlet in the industrial north had continued despite the outbreak of World War I, with a new opening on High Street in Belfast on 6 November 1915. After this, more stores opened in towns and cities throughout Ireland. In 1921, the company's two stores in Dublin were forcibly closed by agents of Sinn Féin, an event which the American parent had not anticipated might happen when entering the Dublin market.

By 1931, a decision had been made to liquidate the profitable F.W. Woolworth Company of Ireland, Ltd. and merge with the British concern in order to form one company covering both Ireland and Great Britain—F.W. Woolworth & Co., Ltd., of England. At the time, there were six stores in Ireland: two in Dublin and one each in Belfast, Cork, Kilkenny and Limerick. In 1966, the Grafton Street store had been rebuilt in the modern style where the new look mimicked an identical transformation which had recently been completed at the store in Limerick.

On the night of 23 October 1971, during The Troubles in Northern Ireland, three men in their twenties were shot in the street by the British Army from an observation post on the roof of the Hill Street Woolworth store. They were mistakenly believed to be engaged in a bank robbery across the street.

In the 1970s, the Cork and Tipperary stores also had makeovers and in 1980 alone the stores on Henry Street in Dublin, Limerick and Waterford had all been modernised, while Galway had been the last store to be refurbished before the American majority shareholders sold out in 1982.

At the same time under-performing stores had been weeded out. The branch in Thomas Street, Dublin, which had been a disaster, had been closed in the 1960s, followed by Carlow, which had pioneered self-service in the Irish chain in 1971, and the branches in Bray and Thurles. The modernisation of the Tipperary store caused its sales and profit to collapse, causing the store to close in 1978.

=== Withdrawal from the Republic ===
In 1983, Woolworth informed staff of its intention to pick 37 freehold branches to be sold. When news broke in April 1984 that the Grafton Street branch had been sold for IR£4.75 million few were surprised. It occupied a prime spot, and its IR£1.6 million annual turnover had long been eclipsed by its neighbour across the River Liffey in Henry Street, where sales had just topped IR£4m for the first time. Grafton Street had the equivalent of 30 full-time staff, all of whom were given the option of redundancy or a transfer to a neighbouring store. Most considered this a sad but acceptable sacrifice if it meant that judgement day had passed.

On 25 July 1984, Woolworth announced it would withdraw from the Republic altogether, arguing that almost all of the stores were loss-making and could no longer be considered viable. Semi-state bodies such as Córus Trácthála Teo (CTT), which championed the efforts of many small manufacturing concerns supplying Woolworth, were also oddly silent. In 1981, CTT had forecast that the IR£2.5m worth of Irish-made goods sold from Woolworth counters per annum would rise to IR£7m in 1982 and had expected further growth to rise to IR£15m over the next five years, but such optimistic hopes were dashed. All of the 18 remaining stores in the Republic closed on 6 October 1984 and resulted in 277 jobs being lost.

In August 1996, market research was undertaken by Woolworths Group investigating opportunities to re-enter the Republic of Ireland market. About 32 potential locations were identified that could support a Woolworths store. However, the project did not proceed beyond the market research phase.

=== Northern Ireland stores ===
After withdrawing from the Republic, F. W. Woolworth plc took full control of stores in Northern Ireland where these stores were popular with cross-border shoppers from the Republic, especially stores close to the Irish border. The stores continued to trade normally until the Woolworths Group went into administration in November 2008. Stores in Northern Ireland began to close during Christmas 2008 and the final stores closed on 3 January 2009, when the Woolworths brand disappeared from the island of Ireland.

== See also ==
- Woolworths Group
- F. W. Woolworth Company
