= Woolworths (United Kingdom) =

British variety retailer

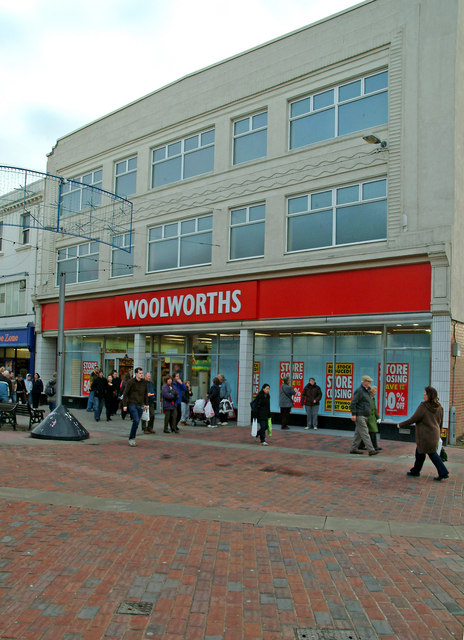
- Woolworths branch at 33-35 Montague Street, Worthing, in 2008
- Trade name: Woolworth; Woolworths; Woolco (1960s–1986); Big W (1998–2004)
- Industry: Retail and distribution
- Founded: 5 November 1909; 117 years ago in Liverpool, United Kingdom
- Founder: Frank Winfield Woolworth
- Defunct: 6 January 2009; 17 years ago
- Area served: United Kingdom; Ireland; Barbados; Cyprus; Jamaica; Southern Rhodesia; Trinidad and Tobago
- Owner: Woolworth GmbH (trademarks)
- Website: www.woolworths.co.uk at the Wayback Machine (archived 11 November 2008)

Woolworths was a high-street variety retail chain, founded in 1909 by Frank Winfield Woolworth as the British division of the American F.W. Woolworth Company.

In the 1920s and 1930s, Woolworth had engaged in rapid nationwide expansion, becoming one of the country's largest retailers. It also operated Woolworth divisions internationally, such as in Ireland. In the 1960s, the retailer introduced its Woolco hypermarket stores. In 1982, Woolworth separated from its American parent when it was purchased by Paternoster Stores Ltd, which would become Kingfisher plc. The sale included B&Q which Woolworth had previously acquired. In 1984, Woolworth became Woolworths.

In June 2001, Woolworths split from Kingfisher plc and became Woolworths Group PLC, including MVC, VCI Group (later known as 2Entertain), Entertainment UK, Streets Online, Chad Valley and Ladybird. The Woolworths Group later included Total Home Entertainment and Bertrams.

On 26 November 2008, the Woolworths and Entertainment UK subsidiaries entered administration. Deloitte closed all 807 Woolworths shops between 27 December 2008 and 6 January 2009, resulting in 27,000 job losses. Woolworths Group plc entered administration on 27 January 2009. In February 2009, Shop Direct Group (later known as The Very Group) purchased the Woolworths brand and website, which continued as an online-only business, until its closure in June 2015, when it was merged into Very.co.uk.

In May 2021, the former German division of the F.W. Woolworth Company, Woolworth GmbH, acquired the British and Irish Woolworths brand and website from The Very Group for an undisclosed sum.

== History ==
=== Establishment of the business ===
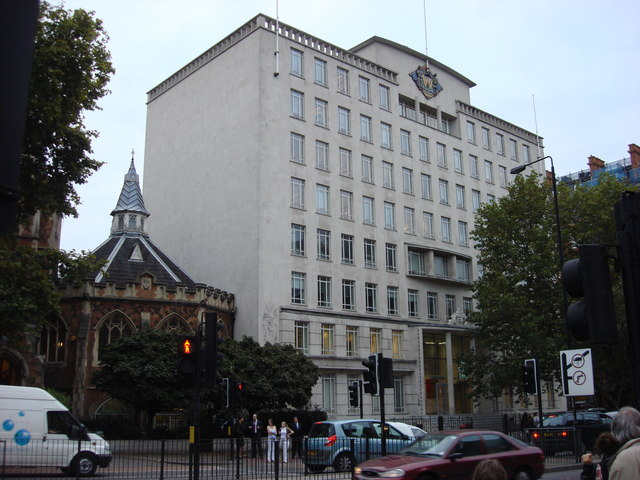
Woolworths head office on Marylebone Road, London

The British branch of the F. W. Woolworth Company, which had been founded in Pennsylvania, F. W. Woolworth & Co. Ltd, was founded by Frank Woolworth in Liverpool, England, on 5 November 1909. Frank Woolworth allegedly had ancestry in Woolley, Cambridgeshire – Frank claimed he had traced his ancestry through the Pilgrim Fathers to a small "farm in middle England". When Frank eventually travelled to England in 1890, he docked in Liverpool and travelled by train to Stoke-on-Trent for the purchase of china and glassware for Woolworth's ranges, but also noted his love of England in his diary and his aspirations for bringing the Woolworth name to England:

I believe that a good penny and sixpence store, run by a live Yankee, would be a sensation here.

— Frank Woolworth

During the buying trip, Woolworth met a young clerk, William Lawrence Stephenson, who was recommended to him by John Wanamaker. Wanamaker had established a large chain of department stores across the United States and was one of Woolworth's heroes. Stephenson was invited to London to meet Woolworth again, and was offered the job as director of the new company, which he accepted.

After the idea for the creation of the British business, Frank Woolworth had offered invitations to shop managers in the United States to establish shops in the UK and had only received offers to take positions at the time of his illness in March 1909 from Fred Woolworth of the Sixth Avenue and Samuel Balfour of the 14th Street shops in New York City. After these initial offers, Byron Miller, a superintendent in a Boston shop, also offered his assistance and set sail with the other volunteers on the steam boat Kaiserin Auguste Victoria on 29 May 1909 for England from Hoboken.

Frank Woolworth expected other members of staff to admire the volunteers in establishing FW Woolworth & Co in Britain. However, Carson C. Peck, vice president and general manager of the company, had reservations with enlisting staff members to travel to Britain, questioning whether Woolworth had indeed created the new business adventure following a dream, or due to his dissatisfaction with the current condition of the American branch.

Peck also asked those who were willing to volunteer to reconsider their decision, claiming that those who had volunteered were unaware of the uncertainty and risks involved and that some were only tentatively willing to engage in Woolworth's new endeavour: His concerns mainly centred on the fact that the majority of the managers who followed the decision did so out of loyalty to Woolworth, and that moving such a valuable resource already established in the United States to what was a financially unproven "Little Infant" in the UK would have a detrimental effect upon the "Bread and Butter" of the Company.

To me it seems that these return sheets are in danger of being misunderstood and that it is a good deal like asking a boy to volunteer to go into a bear's den when he does not know whether he is to eat a nicely cooked luscious bear's steak, or be eaten by a great, big black bear.

— Carson C. Peck

=== 1900s–1910s ===
Despite reservations such as Peck's, the decision to launch in the United Kingdom went ahead as previously planned by Woolworth. He considered several locations for the first shops, together with future possible sites. The chosen location for the first shop was 25-25A Church Street and 8 Williamson Street in the centre of Liverpool (the street addresses of the different entrances). It opened on 5 November 1909 with a performance by a full orchestra, circus acts and fireworks.

As a means of adherence to American trading tradition, only viewing of items was allowed on the first day of the shop's opening. This included guests being given complementary tea while being entertained by a traditional brass band in the refreshment room. The event was reported positively by the local newspaper, the Liverpool Courier, which praised the decor of the shops along with the value and range of items on sale.

Despite local press praise, British national newspaper the Daily Mail likened Frank Woolworth to American showman P. T. Barnum and claimed that the location had been decided as part of a contingency plan in the event of failure so as to facilitate escape from any financial liability. Despite these reservations, the shop proved to be a success; large queues outside and low priced 3d. and 6d. ("threepenny and sixpenny") items leading to it being almost stripped bare of goods before the end of the first day of trading and being attributed to mass purchased mass-produced foreign and local goods.

The business expanded into Ireland, opening a shop on Grafton Street in Dublin on 23 April 1914 Plans and one on High Street in Belfast on 6 November 1915.

At the onset of the First World War, F.W. Woolworth & Co. had 40 shops in Great Britain and Ireland located in most major cities - from which a total of 57 staff including shop managers had enlisted; the majority of whom did not return after the end of the war in 1918. Despite American staff again offering their services to the Woolworths branches in Britain, remaining staff increased their efforts to cope with the lack of staff members throughout the war with several staff members being promoted to managerial positions.

Shops in the United States, which were then stocking ranges also present in British shops, were dependent upon European manufacturers which had adopted newer production methods than their American counterparts.

=== 1920s–1930s ===
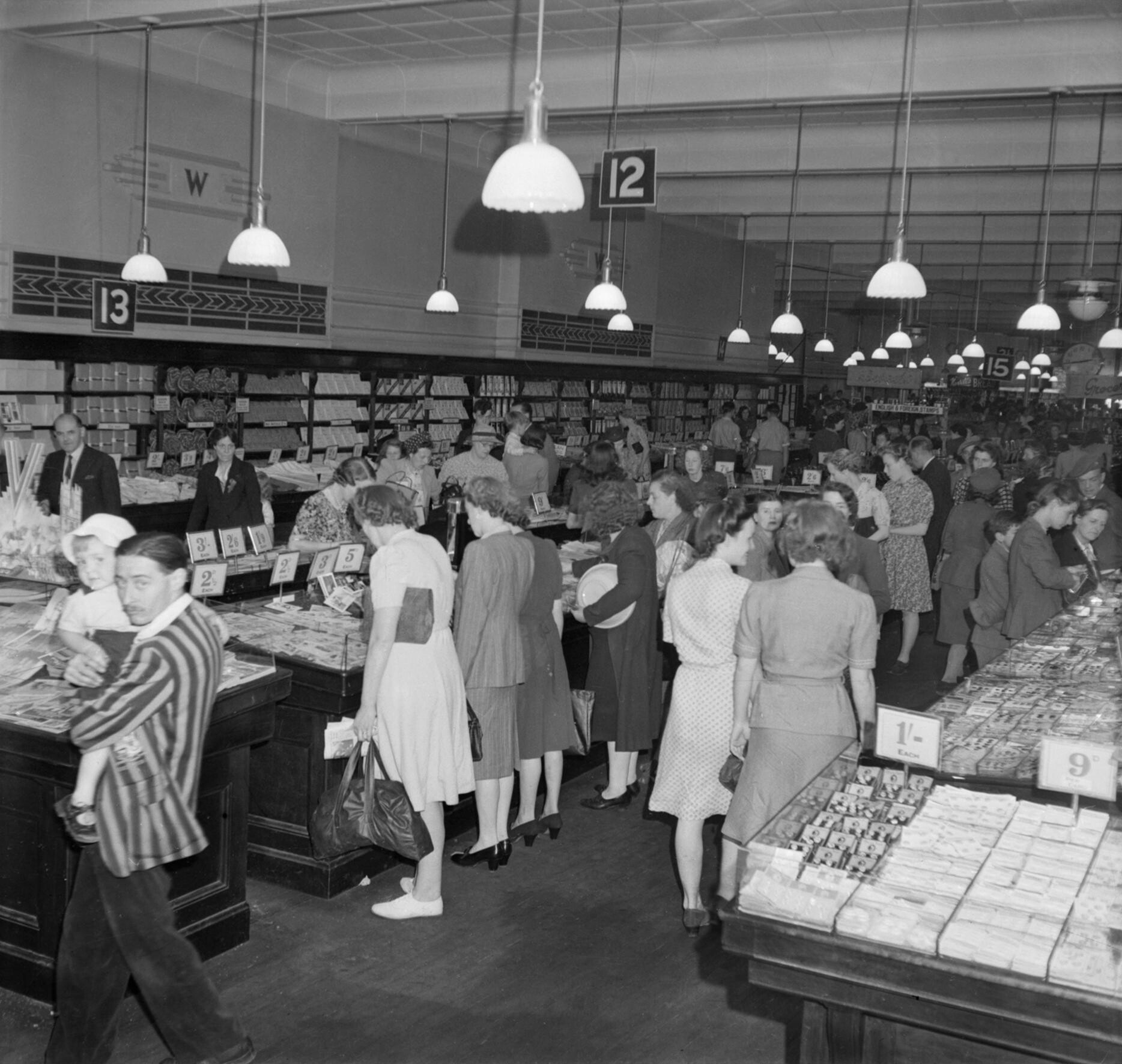
Interior of a Woolworths shop in Reading in 1945

Following the First World War, the company continued to expand with the opening of further branches. By 1923, there were 130 branches, and William Lawrence Stephenson (1880–1963) became managing director. He implemented a strategy of major expansion, with the company buying or building freehold properties. Many of the shops had distinctive faience tiled art deco frontages. The expansion was funded entirely out of earnings and without any borrowing or further capitalisation. The 400th branch, at Southport, Lancashire, opened on 12 July 1930, and the company was floated on the London Stock Exchange in 1931. The US parent company reduced its holding in the company to 51.7% at that time. In 1934, the 600th shop was opened, in Wallington in Surrey.

=== 1940s–1950s ===
Expansion was effectively suspended between 1940 and 1950, owing to the Second World War and post-war restrictions, but then resumed. The 800th branch, at Wilton Road, Victoria, London, opened in September 1953.

A shop was opened in Kingston in Jamaica in 1954. This was followed in 1959 by one in Salisbury in Southern Rhodesia (now Harare, Zimbabwe); its layout was based on that of a shop in Guildford. Woolworth also operated shops in Barbados, Trinidad and Tobago, and the West Indies.

On 22 May 1958, the 1,000th branch (known as "Portslade" to distinguish it from the existing Hove branch) opened in Boundary Road, Hove. The peak of 1,141 branches was reached in the late 1960s. From then until the US parent sold out in 1982, a number of branches were closed and sold, and at the time that ownership shifted to the UK, there were about 1,000 branches.

=== 1960s–1970s ===
Woolworths tried the large out-of-town or hypermarket format in the 1960s with the Woolco shops. While some of these were closed, the majority were sold to the Dee Corporation in the early 1980s and reopened as Gateway hypermarkets, later being taken over by Asda.

One of Woolworths' flagship locations, on Briggate in Leeds, suffered a major fire in 1969. The shop, which opened in 1913, was spread over four floors and sustained extensive damage, requiring a total refit. The shop was not open to the public at the time and the building was evacuated, avoiding fatalities, although some staff suffered minor injuries. It took several hours for the fire to be fully extinguished.

=== 1980s–1990s ===
In 1982, the British Woolworths and its sister chain B&Q were acquired by Paternoster Stores Ltd, the forerunner of Kingfisher plc. Woolworths Group plc was formed by the demerger of Kingfisher's general merchandise business, and began trading as a listed company on the London Stock Exchange on 28 August 2003, using the symbol WLW.

In October 1984, the Woolworths shops in the Republic of Ireland were closed. In August 1996, market research was undertaken by Woolworths investigating opportunities to re-enter the Republic of Ireland market. About 32 potential locations were identified that could support a Woolworths location. However, the project did not proceed beyond the market research phase.

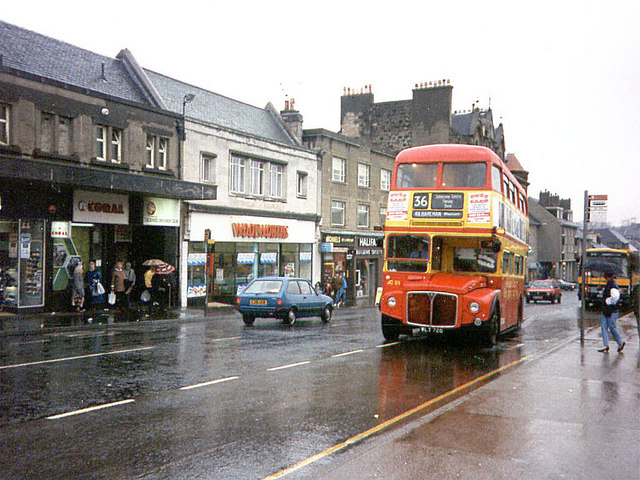
Woolworths shop in Johnstone, Renfrewshire April 1989

During the 1980s, management rationalised merchandise lines into clearly defined categories: entertainment, home, children (toys and clothing) and confectionery. Many Woolworths branches were downsized during this time. Older branches in major cities were sometimes almost as large as the major department stores nearby. In 1987, for example, Woolworths left its five-floor branch on Briggate in Leeds (now occupied by House of Fraser), which it had occupied since 1913, and kept only its smaller single-level branch in the Merrion Centre. This was in an area of the city centre which had less pedestrian traffic, of shoppers who were generally on a lower budget.

Woolworths did have several smaller outlets during the 1990s which sold music and confectionery. Smaller outlets with a similar format were also tried at the Sheffield Meadowhall Shopping Centre, but closed in 2003; the Manchester Music and Video shop was superseded by a larger MVC shop, owned by Woolworths Group.

In the late 1990s, the management extended the Woolworths brand into other retail formats and alternative channels to accelerate growth by taking advantage of changing retail trends. Some larger-format shops were opened under the Big W brand, similar to Wal-Mart in the US. Although it was successful at the beginning, the format failed to catch on; the original plan had relied upon leveraging the involvement of other Kingfisher group retailers, but following the de-merger this was no longer possible.

=== 2000s–2010s ===
Following a period of losses, Woolworths confirmed in 2004 it would abandon the Big W concept. The group sold seven of the 21 Big W shops in 2005 to Tesco and Asda. The gross internal floor area of the remaining sites was reduced to an optimum trading size of around 40,000 to 50,000 square feet (4,600 m^{2}). Following this, they were rebranded as Woolworths Out of Town shops.

The newly independent Woolworths faced severe competitive and financial pressures. The market for physical copies of music, one of Woolworths' main money spinners, shrank in the early 21st century; specialist music chains such as Our Price collapsed. The major supermarket chains expanded into many of Woolworths' product areas, and the fast-expanding Wilkinson challenged it directly on the high street.

Woolworths did not generally follow the trend started in the 1980s of opening shops at out-of-town locations. One of its few out-of-town stores opened at Dudley's Merry Hill Shopping Centre in 1989, but this closed within a few years due to disappointing trade.

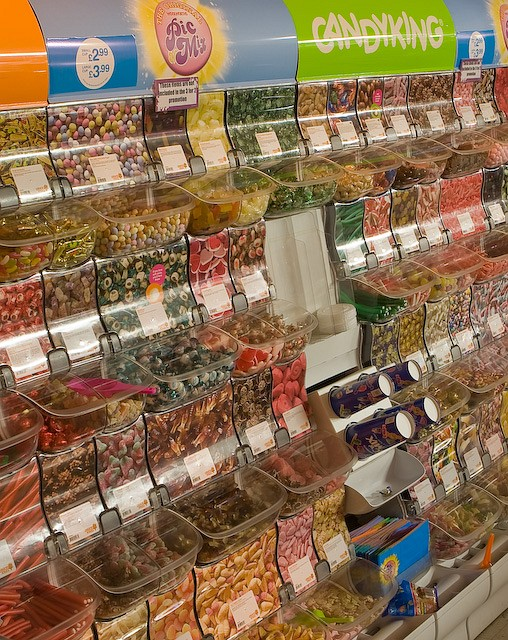
Woolworths became well known for its "pick 'n' mix" sweet selections.

In an attempt to raise the group's corporate profile under the chairmanship of Gerald Corbett, Woolworths sponsored a show garden at the RHS Chelsea Flower Show in 2004. Designed by a group of graduate students from Pickard School of Garden Design, the contemporary-formal style garden was awarded a silver medal.

Woolworths Group plc share price dropped gradually between 2006 and 2008

In the middle of 2006, the business launched an in-store collection service for items ordered on their website or in-store, to complement the already established in-store ordering system. In late September 2006, the Big Red Book was launched, to compete directly with the Argos catalogue.

Woolworths launched the WorthIt! brand as a value range in 2007. The first advertising campaign for the brand aired on 15 June 2007 and featured the characters of Wooly the sheep and Worth the sheepdog. Further advertising campaigns featured celebrities such as Rolf Harris, Jackie Chan, and Kelly Osbourne. The brand covered a wide variety of products including confectionery, electricals, alcohol, jewellery, perfumes, and clothing.

Woolworths had a strongly unionised workforce, with shop stewards such as Paul Thompson of Unite (formerly the Transport and General Workers' Union) particularly active in the north of the UK.

In July 2008, the board rejected a bid from Iceland founder Malcolm Walker to buy Woolworths' 819 shops for £50m. Walker's bid did not include Entertainment UK or the stake in 2 Entertain, and also avoided taking on Woolworths' debt and pension liabilities.

On 12 August 2008, Woolworths Group announced the appointment of Steve Johnson, former chief executive officer of Focus DIY, to the post of chief executive. He replaced Trevor Bish-Jones, who had left in June. Woolworths scrapped its interim dividend in September 2008, after it announced a pre-tax loss of £99.7m for the six months to 2 August. At the same time, Johnson outlined a possible turnaround plan to sell 120 shops, axe a quarter of its products, reduce web operations and cut jobs.

At that time, the retailer's largest shareholder was Iranian property developer Ardeshir Naghshineh, with a 10.2% stake. A consortium led by Icelandic investor Baugur, called Unity owned a 10% stake in Woolworths. In October 2008, Sir Alan Sugar, founder of electronics firm Amstrad, increased his stake in Woolworths to around 4%. Theo Paphitis, owner of stationery retailer Ryman, also stated his interest in the company.

The 2008 financial crisis and the Great Recession reduced availability of credit and consumer spending.

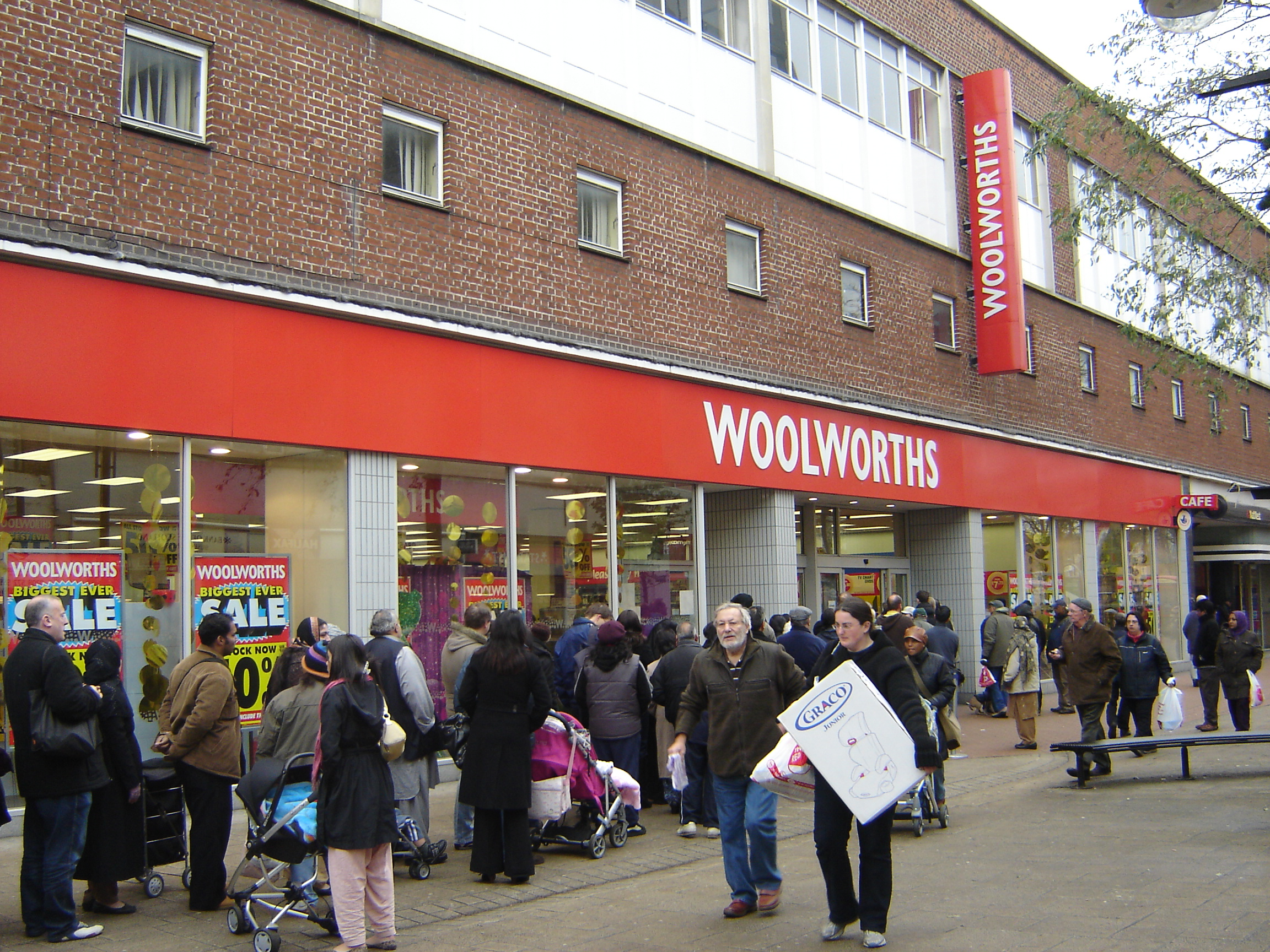
Queues form in Hounslow for the final sale

On 19 November 2008, The Times reported that the Woolworths' retail business was a target for restructuring specialist Hilco UK, who would buy the retail arm for a nominal £1; this was confirmed the same day. The deal would have left Woolworths Group with its profitable distribution and publishing businesses and a reduced debt load. Ardeshir Naghshineh criticised the plan, recommending instead that the company sell some of the shops to raise more funds.

The group's banks, GMAC and Burdale, rejected the deal and recalled their loans, forcing the group to place the retail business and Entertainment UK into administration. On 26 November 2008, the trading of shares in Woolworths PLC was suspended, and Neville Kahn, Dan Butters, and Nick Dargan of Deloitte were appointed joint administrators. When the company entered administration, it had a debt of £385 million. The administrators announced that they were aiming to keep the company as a going concern over the crucial Christmas period, although analysts feared that any heavy discounting would create a domino effect and drag down other high street retailers. Deloitte later announced they had received "substantial interest" in Woolworths.

When news of Woolworths' entry into administration was widely publicised, National Lottery operator Camelot immediately suspended Woolworths from selling their lottery tickets and scratch cards, as well as preventing claimants from redeeming prizes at the shops.

On 5 December 2008, Woolworths recorded their greatest single day takings of £27 million, and axed 450 head office and support staff jobs. A closing-down sale started on 11 December.

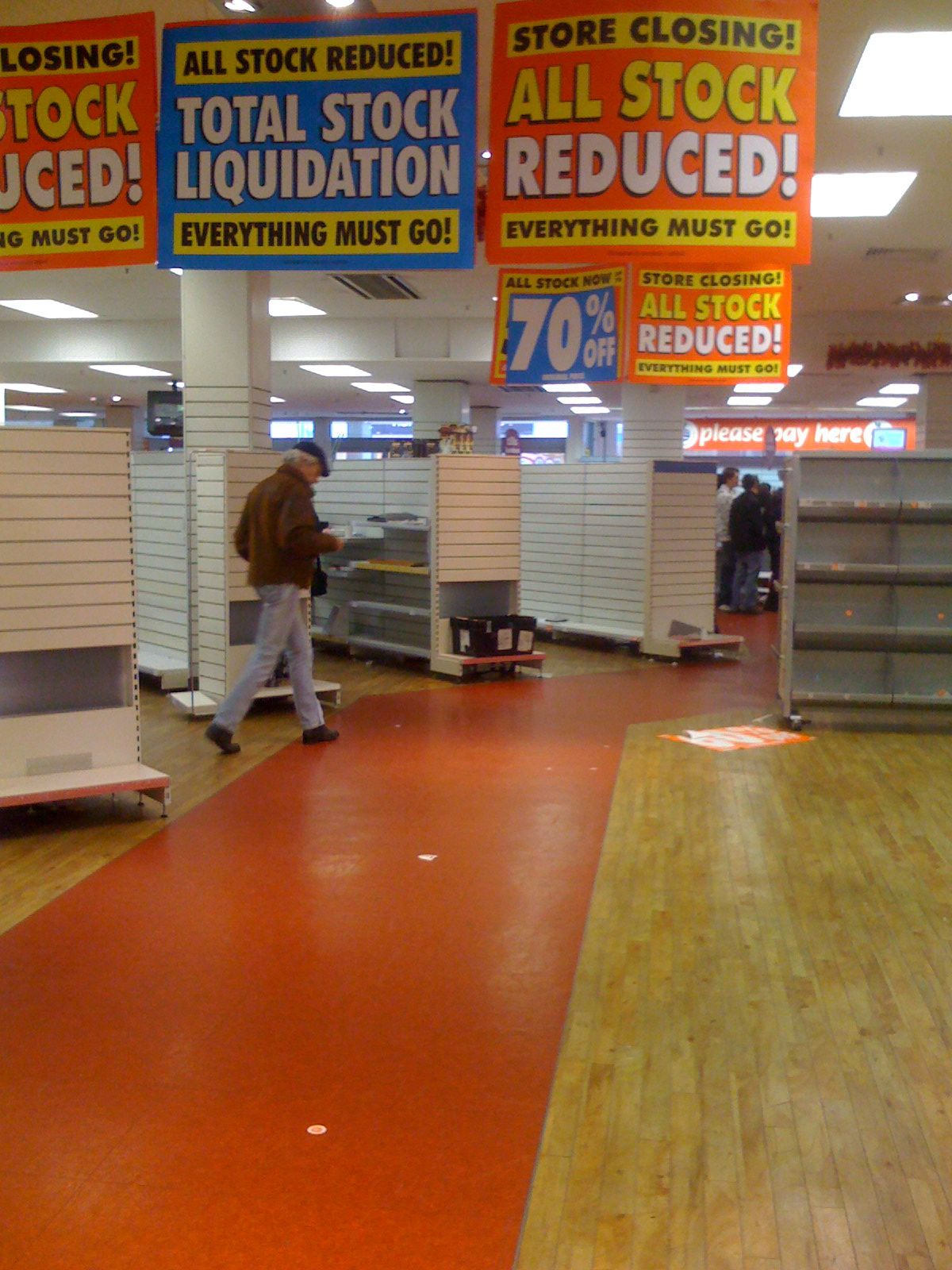
Woolworths in Croydon, shelves bare, on last day of Final Clearance Sale

On 17 December 2008, administrators announced that all 807 Woolworths locations would close by 5 January 2009 (later changed to 6 January), with 27,000 job losses. Deloitte's Neville Kahn also said that it was unclear how much of Woolworths' debt would be paid. In the last few days of trading, discounts of up to 90% were offered, and a number of shops sold all of their stock, many selling all of their fixtures and fittings too.

The shops were closed in phases, and the final two closing days were moved back a day to try to sell more of the remaining stock and to ease logistics of closing.

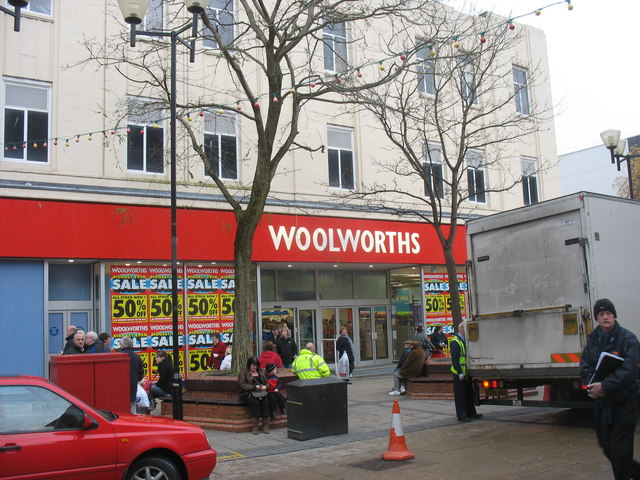
The Woolworths in Bangor, Gwynedd days before closing. It was replaced by a Boots outlet.

- 207 shops closed on 27 December 2008
- 37 closed on 29 December
- 164 closed on 30 December
- 200 closed on 3 January 2009
- remaining shops (199) closed on 6 January 2009

The former chief executive of Kingfisher, Woolworths' former parent company, and Ardeshir Naghshineh, a major shareholder of Woolworths, criticised the closures.

On 19 January 2009, the owner, Woolworths Group, announced its intention to also enter administration, as it could no longer pay its debts. The application was heard by the High Court on 27 January, and Woolworths Group PLC entered administration.

The trade unions complained of the collective redundancies and they started various legal actions before the UK tribunals based on the absence of proper consultation of the employee representatives. The UK Court of Appeal referred the case to the Court of Justice of the European Union which partially disagreed with the unions by an important decision of 30 April 2015.

=== 2020s ===
In October 2020, an unverified Twitter account named @UKWoolworths announced that Woolworths UK was planning to relaunch. The announcement was reported by dozens of mainstream British websites, including MailOnline and the Daily Mirror. Within hours The Very Group, the owner of the Woolworths brand, confirmed that the account was a hoax. The stunt was perpetrated by a teenage student, Luke Castle, who claimed to have run it as an experiment "testing the brand loyalty of the British public".

In January 2024, it was announced that Woolworths may make a return 15 years after it closed, when the German company announced its expansion throughout Europe and the UK was one of its high priorities and this looks more likely, following the closure of Wilko just a year earlier in the UK. Woolworth GmbH's chief executive told BBC News that the UK was on his "bucket list" of destinations for international expansion.

== Aftermath of insolvency in the UK ==
=== Former shops ===
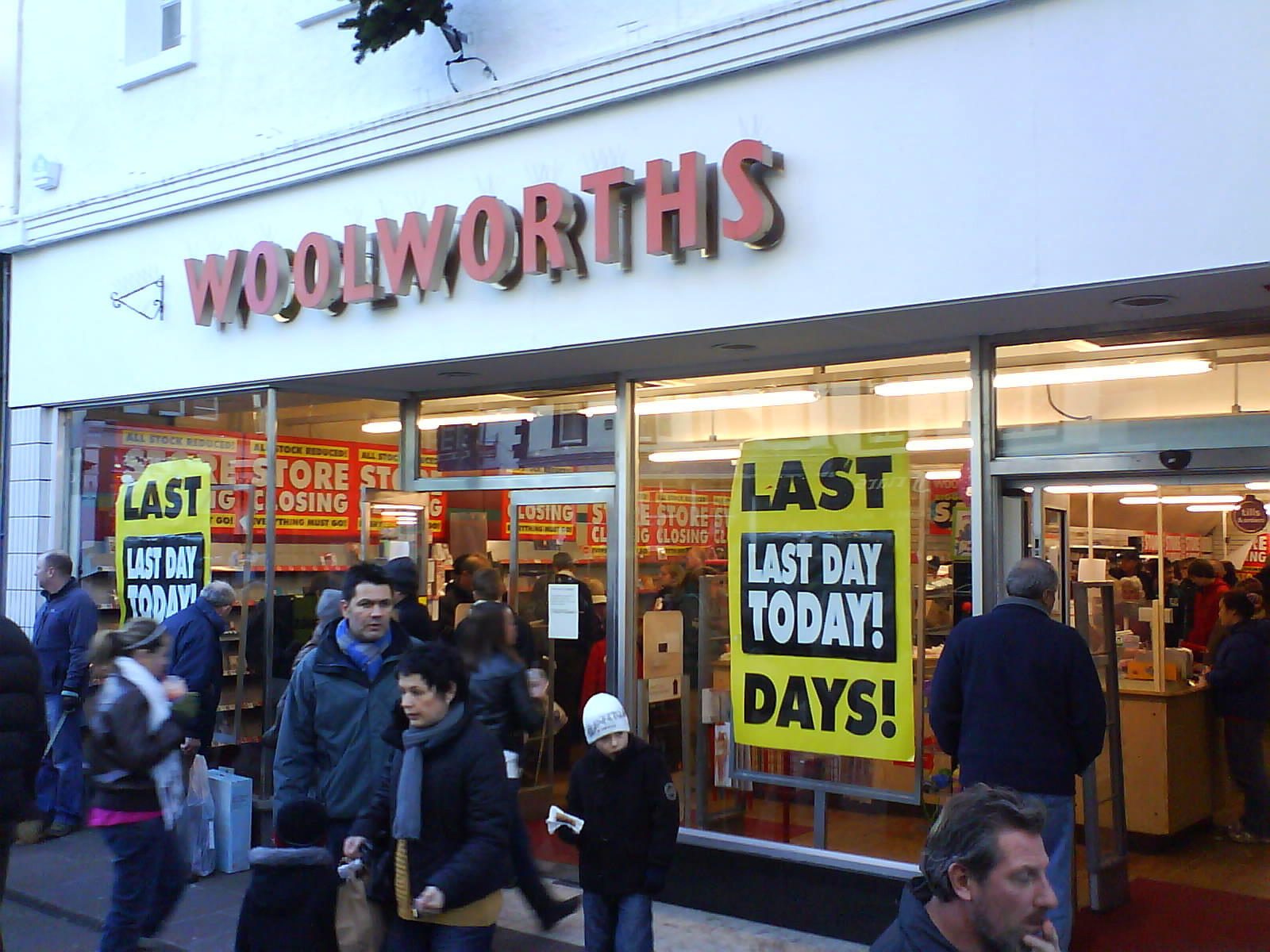
Woolworths in Keswick on its final day of trading in December 2008

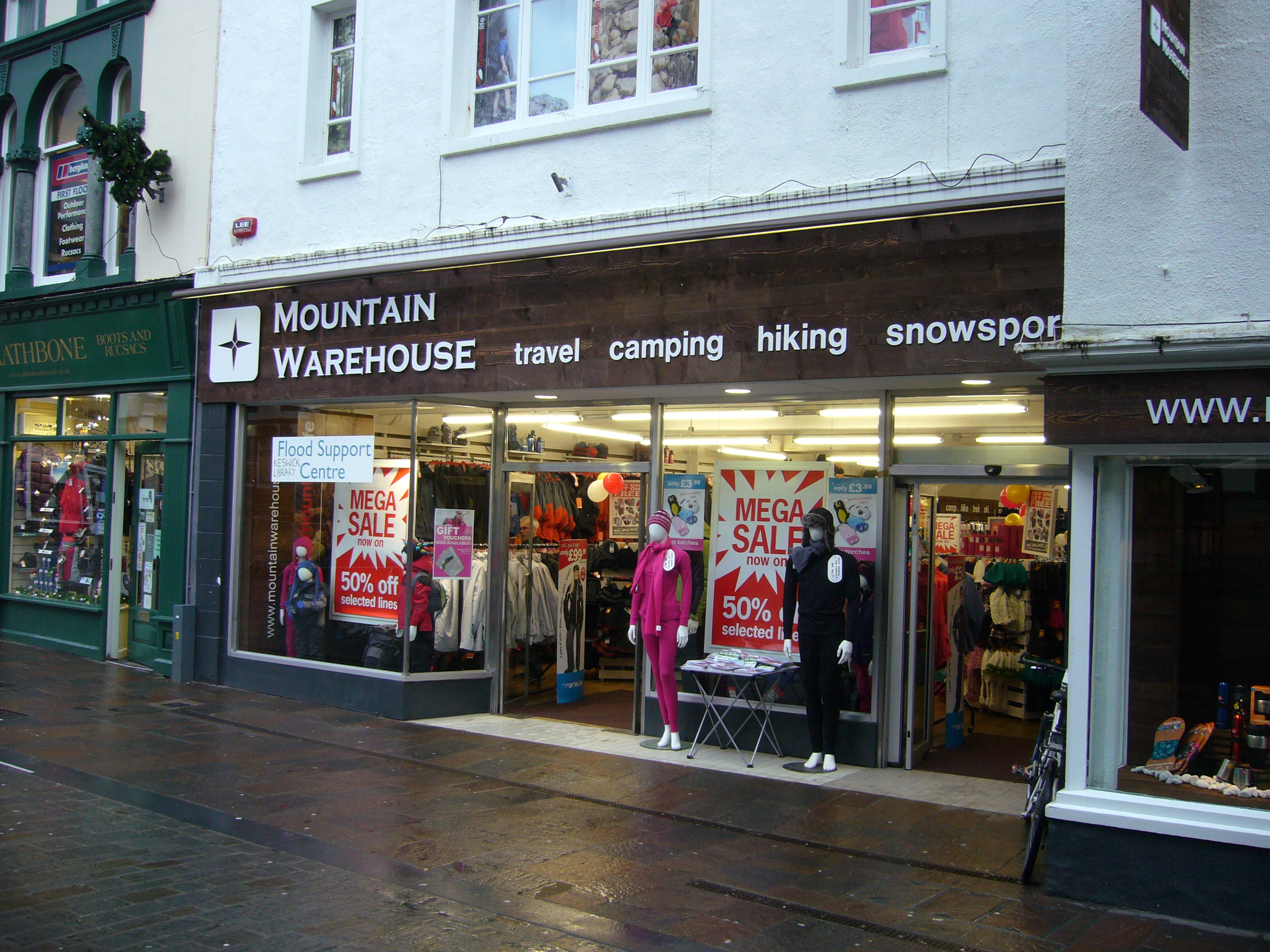
The former Woolworths in Keswick, seen in December 2009, became a Mountain Warehouse

The administrators announced on 10 December 2008, that they were having difficulty selling the company as a going concern, and as a result, some shops might close before the end of the month. Talks were still progressing to sell individual shops and leases to a number of retailers, said to include the supermarket chains Morrisons, Tesco, Asda, Sainsbury's, The Co-operative Group, and Poundland.

In December 2008, Woolworths executive Tony Page and former UBS banker Gareth Thomas were trying to raise around £30,000,000 to relaunch the brand after closure with a chain of 125 shops. However, a deal could not be met in time. The government was also asked in a final attempt to make the deal but without success.

Then-Prime Minister Gordon Brown noted that the government had considered saving Woolworths, but they concluded that it was a "financially unviable" business.

The supermarket chain Iceland bought 51 of the shops on 9 January 2009 for an undisclosed sum. Baugur, one of the major shareholders of Woolworths, partly owns Iceland, and Baugur UK itself entered administration in February. A further five former shops in Wales were bought by The Original Factory Shop in April 2009. Across the UK, shops were sporadically replaced by other retailers such as Next, Boyes, Boots, Primark, TK Maxx, Home Bargains, and WHSmith.

In August 2010, the BBC reported that more than 300 (i.e., approximately 40%) of former Woolworths outlets remained empty, and that the largest group now using former Woolworths shops were discount retailers - such as Poundland. By January 2012, it was reported that there were still 105 empty former Woolworths shops, and a further 68 had been demolished.

=== Alworths ===
According to press reports on 17 February 2009, Tony Page and Gareth Thomas were planning to open a chain of shops adopting the Woolworths format, but under a different name. A shop opened under the Alworths name on 5 November 2009 in Didcot, on the site of a former Woolworths shop, without the involvement of Page or Thomas. By January 2011, 18 shops had been opened, although in April, the company also entered administration and closed.

=== Wellworths ===
Wellworths' logo from 2009–2010

The Woolworths shop in Dorchester, Dorset was reopened as an independent business named Wellworths by the shop manager Claire Robertson. It was officially opened by BBC Radio 2 DJ Chris Evans on 11 March 2009. It was later renamed Wellchester.

Wellchester ceased trading in August 2012, after Robertson left to set up her own retail consultancy business.

=== Woolworths.co.uk ===
The Woolworths brand and domain was bought by Shop Direct Group (later known as The Very Group), owned by Sir David and Sir Frederick Barclay, on 2 February 2009. The Times estimated that they would have paid between £5 million and £10 million for the brand. Woolworths also launched an Easter egg website, called Woolies Wonderland, for Easter 2009. The company announced it would relaunch Woolworths as an online retailer. The website was launched on 26 June 2009. It has been closed since June 2015.

== Incidents ==
=== Disasters ===
==== New Cross, London ====
Many branches of Woolworths suffered severe bomb damage and even destruction during the Luftwaffe attacks in the early part of the Second World War. However, it was towards the end of the war that the largest civilian loss of life due to direct enemy fire in Britain during the conflict occurred when, at lunchtime on 25 November 1944, a German V-2 rocket fell on a packed Woolworths shop in New Cross Road, killing 168 people (including 15 children), injuring 122 others and razing the building to the ground. The neighbouring London Co-operative Society shop was also demolished in the attack. The shop was especially busy as news of a delivery of hard-to-obtain saucepans generated huge crowds, many of whom were queueing outside at the time of the rocket's impact.

Planning and economic restrictions after the war meant Woolworths did not build a replacement shop on the site until 1960; this closed in 1984. It was reported that some employees there felt the building was haunted.

Lewisham London Borough Council and Woolworths erected a plaque on the site commemorating those who died that day. There is now an Iceland supermarket on the site.

=== Fire safety ===
During the period from 1971 to 1981, a series of fires occurred in Woolworths premises which brought into sharp focus the company's complacent attitude towards fire safety, a policy which culminated in a number of fatalities. As a result of the damage caused to the reputation of the business by these events, the American parent owners decided to sell the British operation to Paternoster Stores, which was eventually renamed Kingfisher. The company actively promoted the use of smoke detectors after these fires, a policy which helped increase their usage and reduce their cost.

==== Central Warehouse, Rochdale ====
On 6 May 1971, a fire broke out at the main distribution depot at Rochdale, Lancashire. The site was split into three sections, along with an administration block that housed the company’s new mainframe computer system and all stock and accounting records. The fire soon spread owing to the failure of the sprinkler system; this led to administration staff frantically dis-assembling the computer and passing parts of it, along with stock cards and other records, out of windows onto waiting lorries.

Over 100 fire fighters attended the blaze and they managed to save two-thirds of the building with no loss of life. The resultant insurance payout of £3m was the highest of its kind in the north-west of England at that time.

==== High Street, Colchester ====
On 2 October 1973, a fire broke out in the storeroom of the shop at 40–50 High Street, Colchester. The blaze soon spread to the rest of the shop and the building was totally destroyed. Although all customers and staff were evacuated, subsequent findings blamed a lack of a sprinkler system (which was not, and still is not, a legal requirement) and poor procedures in place for staff to deal with fires and evacuations.

==== Central Manchester ====
A fire erupted just after 1pm on 8 May 1979 at the Manchester shop opposite Piccadilly Gardens, said at the time to be the largest Woolworths in Europe, with six floors plus two basement levels. The fire, which started in the second floor furnishing department, killed nine shoppers and one member of staff, of whom three were found just six feet away from an exit with another three bodies nearby.

==== Worcester ====
On 1 October 1979, the Woolworths shop located in Worcester's High Street was severely damaged in a large fire. There were no casualties but the shop remained closed for several months until it re-opened in 1980. It was later discovered that the fire was purposely started by a disgruntled staff member, and was worsened by the fact there was no sprinkler system.

==== Wimbledon Broadway ====
In 1981, a fire was discovered in a storeroom at the shop in Wimbledon. Better staff training as a result of the Manchester fire led to a successful evacuation, but the building was totally destroyed by the blaze. A firefighter was killed when he and two colleagues became trapped when the upper levels of the building collapsed.

=== Terrorism ===
As a result of the targeting of high-profile British businesses in Northern Ireland by the Irish Republican Army (IRA) during The Troubles, a number of Woolworth shops suffered significant damage.

==== High Street, Belfast ====
This was the flagship Woolworths shop in Northern Ireland. It suffered a series of incendiary attacks, with one such attack in 1972 gutting the shop. Owing to telephoned warnings, no-one was killed in any of these attacks.

==== Bognor Regis incident ====
On 3 August 1994, a bomb detonated, damaging shops but resulting in no casualties. It was hidden in the pannier of a bicycle that was locked to a post outside the branch on London Road. Fifteen shops were damaged, at around 5:57 pm, littering the street with glass.

The Bognor Regis incident prompted a security alert along the south coast seaside resorts, and a similar bomb was subsequently found. It contained 2.5 kg of Semtex explosive along with an IRA time power unit (TPU).

==== Bangor, County Down ====
Woolworths at 18/22 Main Street, Bangor, County Down, Northern Ireland was targeted by terrorists on 30 March 1974 as part of co-ordinated incendiary bomb attack on the town centre.

At 5 pm, a telephone warning was received that 15 incendiary devices had been placed in the town centre and were due to explode in 30 minutes. Immediate and successful efforts were made by the police to evacuate the commercial centre of the town; however, there was inadequate time to prevent the devices from exploding. The shop was badly damaged after a device exploded on the sales floor. A policeman suffered concussion after he was blown off his feet by the blast, and a female civilian was cut by flying debris.

Other shops targeted in the attack include the town's Co-operative Department Store and FA Wellworth Department Store. The town's Woolworths shop was demolished after the attack. A new 8,000 square feet (740 m^{2}) shop was built on the same site, which reopened in the mid 1970s.

The rebuilt shop suffered minor damage after a 200 lb car bomb exploded a short distance away, near the town's FA Wellworth's shop on the evening of 21 October 1992. Nobody was injured in the explosion, which occurred after most shops in the town centre had closed for the day. However, significant damage was caused to the entrance area of the Woolworths' shop, with windows being blown out, the porch roof being destroyed and a small quantity of stock toward the front of the shop being damaged. Additionally, minor structural damage was caused to the shop's storeroom with two internal partitioning walls adjacent to the generator room and fixtures having to be rebuilt. The shop recommenced trading on 23 October 1992.

== Music ==
Woolworths was for many years a leader in the UK music industry. In the 1950s and well into the 1960s, Woolworths issued recordings available only via its shops on its own label Embassy Records, produced and manufactured by Oriole Records. These releases were double-sided singles featuring two cover versions of current hit singles sold at a much cheaper price. This venture was very successful at the time, but was eventually killed off when other record companies started to issue compilation albums. However, Woolworths remained in the music business selling a wide range of singles and albums, and remained the UK's biggest music retailer well into the 1990s. Even successful nationwide music specialist shops such as Virgin Megastores and HMV did not overtake Woolworths during this time. They later suffered from strong competition in this field from the large supermarket chains Tesco and Asda.

== Cafés ==
In the early days, many Woolworths locations had cafés. However, as the years went on and many larger shops were either closed or downscaled, fewer had cafés. When the shops finally ceased trading in 2008/9, only around 5% of them had cafés. These were usually located at the back of the shops or, when a shop had a second sales floor, they were located either in the basement or upstairs on the first floor. They sold the usual range of hot and cold drinks, with hot food available, including breakfasts and lunch-time meals.

== Subsidiaries ==
=== Entertainment UK ===
Entertainment UK (EUK) was founded as Record Merchandisers Limited in 1966 by EMI Music Publishing to distribute music to non-specialist retailers. It later became a joint venture between a number of record companies. Woolworths became Entertainment UK's largest customer and in 1986 Record Merchandisers Limited was acquired by Kingfisher plc. Record Merchandisers was renamed Entertainment UK in 1988.

EUK became the property of Woolworths Group plc after the de-merger from Kingfisher in 2001. In 2006, Woolworths Group acquired Total Home Entertainment Distribution Limited (THE) and combined it with EUK. In November 2007 the company acquired the book wholesaler and distributor Bertram Books.

EUK was the main supplier of Zavvi under an exclusive supply deal. As a result of EUK entering into administration, on 24 December the music retailer was also forced into administration as it was unable to source stock on favourable terms direct from suppliers. Zavvi later closed entirely, but still continues to this day as an online retailer.

=== Streets Online ===
Streets Online, founded in 1996 by Stephen Cole, was one of the pioneers of online retailing in the UK. The company was the name behind the online bookseller Alphabetstreet and music site Audiostreet. 85% of the company was bought out by the Kingfisher Group in 2000 for £15.7 million, and then became part of the Woolworths Group with its de-merger in 2001. It then became responsible for the web operations of MVC and Tesco. When Kingfisher bought this 85%, the remaining 15% was owned by Sky New Media Ventures (part of BSkyB). In 2003, the company headquarters was moved to the EUK site in Hayes.

=== 2 Entertain ===
2 Entertain was established in September 2004 as a joint venture between the Woolworths Group, and BBC Worldwide. It combined the group's former video publishing, music publishing and video production business (Video Collection International) with BBC Worldwide's former video publishing business (BBC Video), BBC Worldwide would hold 60%, while the Woolworths Group would hold 40%, additionally, both BBC Worldwide and Woolworths Group wanted 2 Entertain to better compete with the major studios. Following negotiations with Woolworth Group's administrators, BBC Worldwide purchased Woolworths' 40% stake in 2 Entertain in March 2010 for £17 million, taking full ownership of the company and would eventually be renamed BBC Studios Home Entertainment (although 2 Entertain is still the legal name of the company).

== Brands ==
=== Winfield ===
The Winfield brand was launched by Woolworths in 1963 and continued until the 1980s. Goods sold under the brand included household cleaners, groceries, kitchenware, perfumes, and other ranges such as fishing tackle.

=== Chad Valley ===
Chad Valley was launched in 1991 to create an own label range of merchandise. The Chad Valley brand name, which has been in existence since 1860, is used on a range of toys and games suitable for children under 8 years old. Home Retail Group, then the parent company of Argos and Homebase, purchased the brand for £5 million on 20 January 2009. Chad Valley first appeared exclusively in the Autumn/Winter 2009 Argos catalogue.

=== Ladybird ===
Ladybird was a brand of children's wear for children aged 0–10 years which was sold exclusively in Woolworths. Before the collapse of the Woolworths chain, it was ranked third overall in the childrenswear market, with a market share of 5%. Woolworths purchased rights to the Ladybird brand in 1984, purchasing it outright from Coats Viyella in 2001. The brand has a history which dates back to a trading partnership beginning in 1934 between the original firm Adolf Pasold & Son and Woolworths. On 1 February 2009, Shop Direct Group purchased the brand and whole rights from the administrators.
