= Very (online retailer) =

British online retailer

Shop Direct Home Shopping Limited
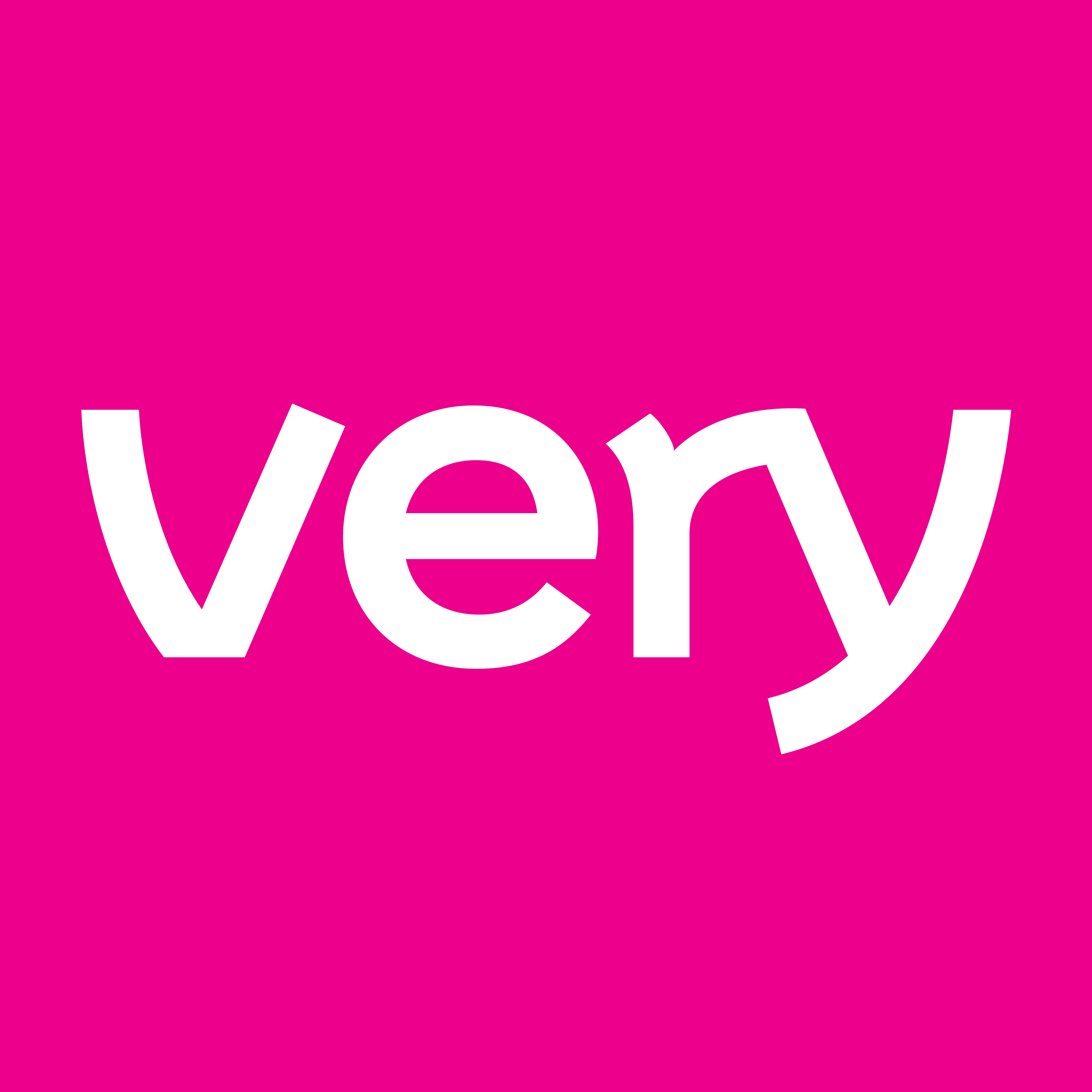
- Type: Subsidiary
- Industry: E-commerce
- Founded: 1990s
- Headquarters: Speke, Liverpool, United Kingdom
- Area served: United Kingdom, Ireland
- Key people: Henry Birch (CEO)
- Products: Clothing, home accessories, toys, gaming
- Owner: The Barclay family
- Parent: The Very Group
- Website: very.co.uk very.ie littlewoods.com

Shop Direct Home Shopping Limited (trading as Very and Littlewoods.com) is a British online retailer, originally founded in the 1990s as the online arm of British company Littlewoods called Littlewoods Direct. In July 2009, Littlewoods Direct was rebranded to Very, with Littlewoods.com continuing as its sister website. The company is based in Speke, Liverpool.

From June 2009 to June 2015, the company also operated the Woolworths.co.uk sister website. After its closure, all Woolworths.co.uk traffic was re-directed to Very.

== History ==
The original Littlewoods brand was a shopping catalogue and retail business headquartered in Liverpool, and was bought by the Barclay brothers in 2002. The website launched in the 1990s and in 2005, the physical stores were sold, leaving Littlewoods as a pure play online retailer. In 2009, Littlewoods Direct was rebranded as Very.co.uk, shifting its focus to online retailing and a younger market. The website launched officially in July 2009. In 2010 a mobile enabled version of the site was launched, upgrading to include video and images in 2011. In the first quarter of 2013/14, mobile sales accounted for over a third of total online sales.

=== Woolworths.co.uk ===
In February 2009, it was announced that Shop Direct Group had purchased the Woolworths intellectual property from the administrators, and would re-launch Woolworths.co.uk at a later date. In June 2009, the company launched the Woolworths.co.uk website. After its closure in June 2015, all Woolworths.co.uk traffic was re-directed to Very.co.uk. In July 2021, the now-called Very Group sold all of the Woolworths intellectual property to Woolworth in Germany.

== Partnerships and promotion ==
Very makes extensive use of both celebrity endorsements and product placement on television and other media. Holly Willoughby and Fearne Cotton have acted as faces of the site, creating branded fashion collections and appearing in adverts. Other names who have worked with the brand include Jameela Jamil and Diana Vickers. In December 2013, former Girls Aloud member Kimberley Walsh became a celebrity designer for the brand. Michelle Keegan launched a fashion and homeware partnership with Very in October 2017.

Very has sponsored V music festival, also offering a delivery service to the festival sites in 2012. It has also sponsored Celebrity Big Brother on Channel 5, with branded, 'click-to-buy' product placement.
