= Woolworth (Europe) =

European chain of discount department stores

Woolworth GmbH

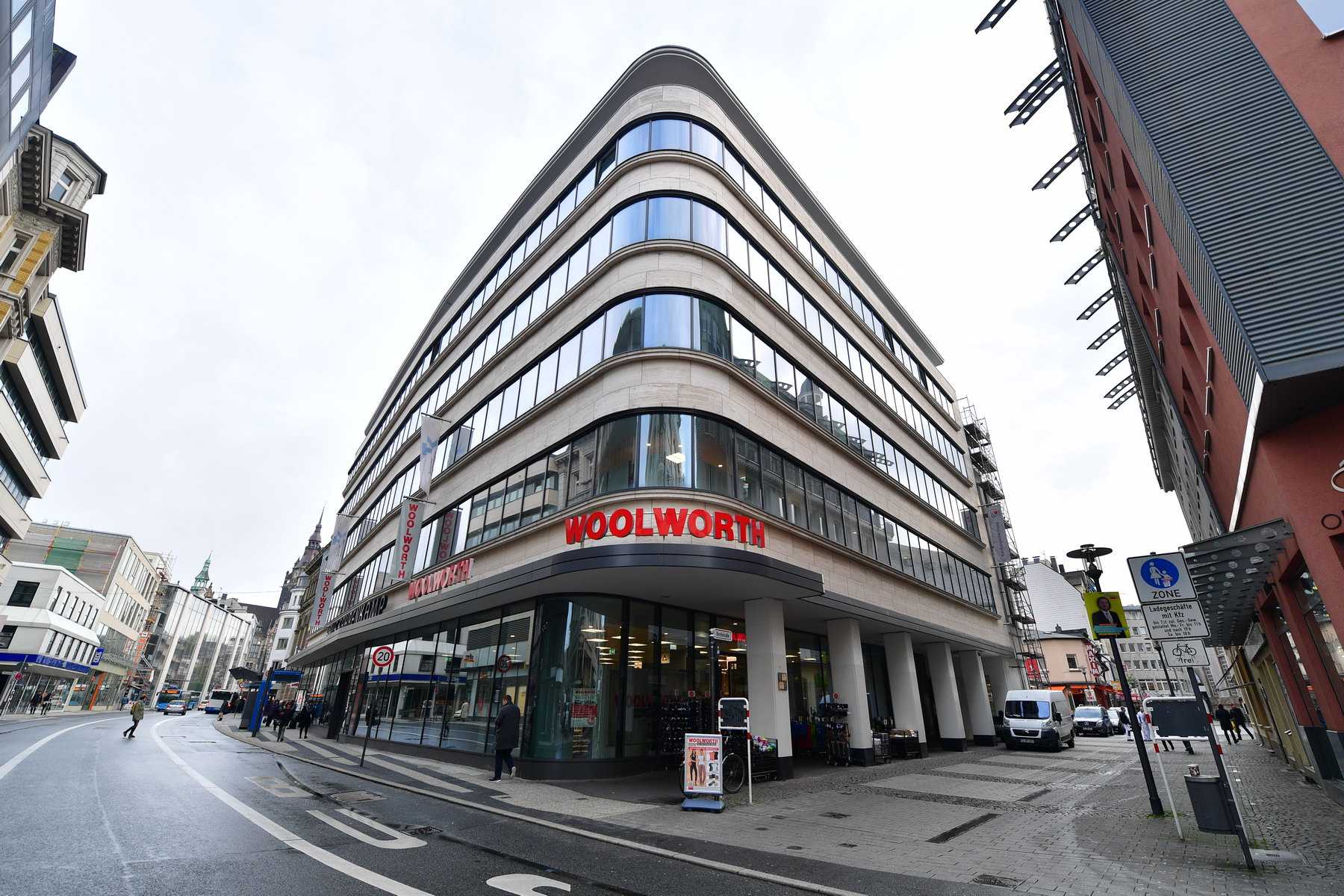
- An example of a Woolworth store in Wuppertal
- Company type: Private
- Founded: 1927; 99 years ago
- Founder: F. W. Woolworth Company
- Headquarters: Unna, Germany
- Number of locations: 1,000+ (2026)
- Area served: Austria; Czech Republic; Germany; Poland; Slovakia
- Key people: Roman Heini (CEO)
- Owner: Tengelmann Group
- Website: woolworth.eu

Woolworth GmbH is a German discount retailer. It was founded in 1927 as the German division of the American F. W. Woolworth Company. In 1998, a management buyout separated it to become its own company. It is currently headquartered in Unna.

It also trades in Austria, Czechia, Poland, and Slovakia. The retailer owns the rights to the "Woolworth" and "Woolworths" names throughout Europe (including the United Kingdom and Ireland), and has stated it is seeking pan-European expansion.

== History ==
In 1927, F. W. Woolworth Co. GmbH was founded with its first store in Bremen. It was a subsidiary of the F. W. Woolworth Company, based in the United States. When it was still part of the original parent company, corporate documents referred to the division as Retail Company of Germany, Inc.

In 1968, the company opened German headquarters in Frankfurt.

The German subsidiary separated from its American parent company in 1998, through a management buyout, and the company was officially renamed to "DWW Deutsche Woolworth GmbH & Co. OHG".

In 2005, the brand opened its 330th store in Germany.

In October 2007, the British investment and consulting company Argyll Partners along with the US financial investor Cerberus Capital Management bought the company.

On 11 April 2009, the Woolworth GmbH board of directors voted to declare insolvency as the chain was squeezed between discounters and more specialist retailers. 23 branches were taken over by the NKD store chain. By the end of August the Federal Cartel Office approved the acquisition of 71 Woolworth stores by the Schlecker retail chain. In September Woolworth started operating as 162 store chain down from 310. During the insolvency the Austrian branches were separated from the German chain in October and bought by bluO an Austrian financial investor, 9 of the 12 stores were later rebranded to Adler and the others closed.

In May 2010, Woolworth was sold to HH Holding, a subsidiary of the Tengelmann Group (which owns KiK and OBI), and by 1 July the headquarters had moved from Frankfurt to Unna. By the end of 2011, the store number had risen to over 200.

In February 2016, the chain opened its 300th branch in Dortmund city centre.

Since 2016, Woolworth has stopped using environmentally harmful plastic shopping bags and instead uses reusable, PET and paper bags. During the opening of new stores and renovation of old stores new energy efficient LED lights are installed. The headquarters in Unna generates some of its own electricity and heat via a combined heat and power plant. Woolworth uses the principle of core activation to regulate temperature through the buildings.

On 31 October 2019, the 400th store opened in Bielefeld.

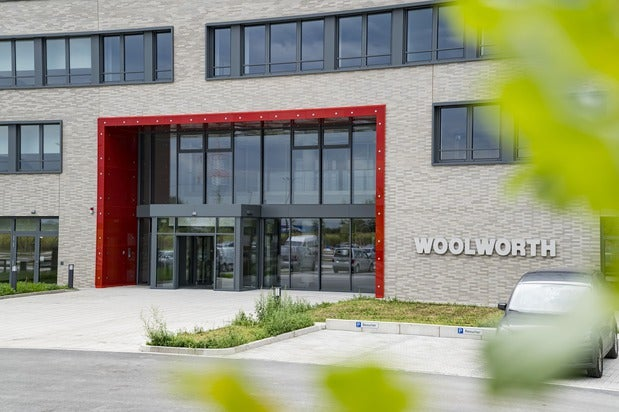
The headquarters for Woolworth in Unna, opened in 2010.

In September-October 2020, the new headquarters opened in Unna located in the Unna/Kamen industrial park, it includes a distribution centre, when it opened the complex had around 450 staff, and will eventually have over 1,000 staff.

Woolworth did not close any stores during the COVID-19 Pandemic and remained relatively unscathed and opened over 100 stores since the start of 2020.

During Autumn 2021, the company started working with ImmoScout24, a real estate platform, to help find spaces where new stores would work well.

In October 2022, Woolworth announced that it sees potential for more than 1,000 locations in the medium term and announced that the chain would expand to Poland in May 2023, it was also stated that the chain had experienced immense financial growth and was becoming more popular due to the cost of living crisis.

== List of international operations ==
=== Austria ===
The retailer established stores in Austria in the early 2000s, before closing in 2009. The chain returned to Austria in November 2023 with a store in Eisenstadt.

=== Czech Republic ===
The first Woolworth store in the Czech Republic opened in June 2025.

=== Poland ===
Woolworth opened its first Polish store in Kraków on 8 May 2023. Other stores quickly followed in Poznań and Warsaw.

=== Slovakia ===
The first Woolworth store in Slovakia opened in October 2025.

=== United Kingdom and Ireland ===
In May 2021, the retailer purchased the dormant British and Irish Woolworth/s brands from The Very Group; both had ceased trading in 2009 and 1984 respectively. The Very Group had continued Woolworths.co.uk as an online retailer from 2009, before merging it into Very.co.uk in 2015. In 2024, a spokesperson for Roman Heini said that Britain is on a bucket list for possible international expansion destinations.
