= Woolworth =

Retail company

F. W. Woolworth Company

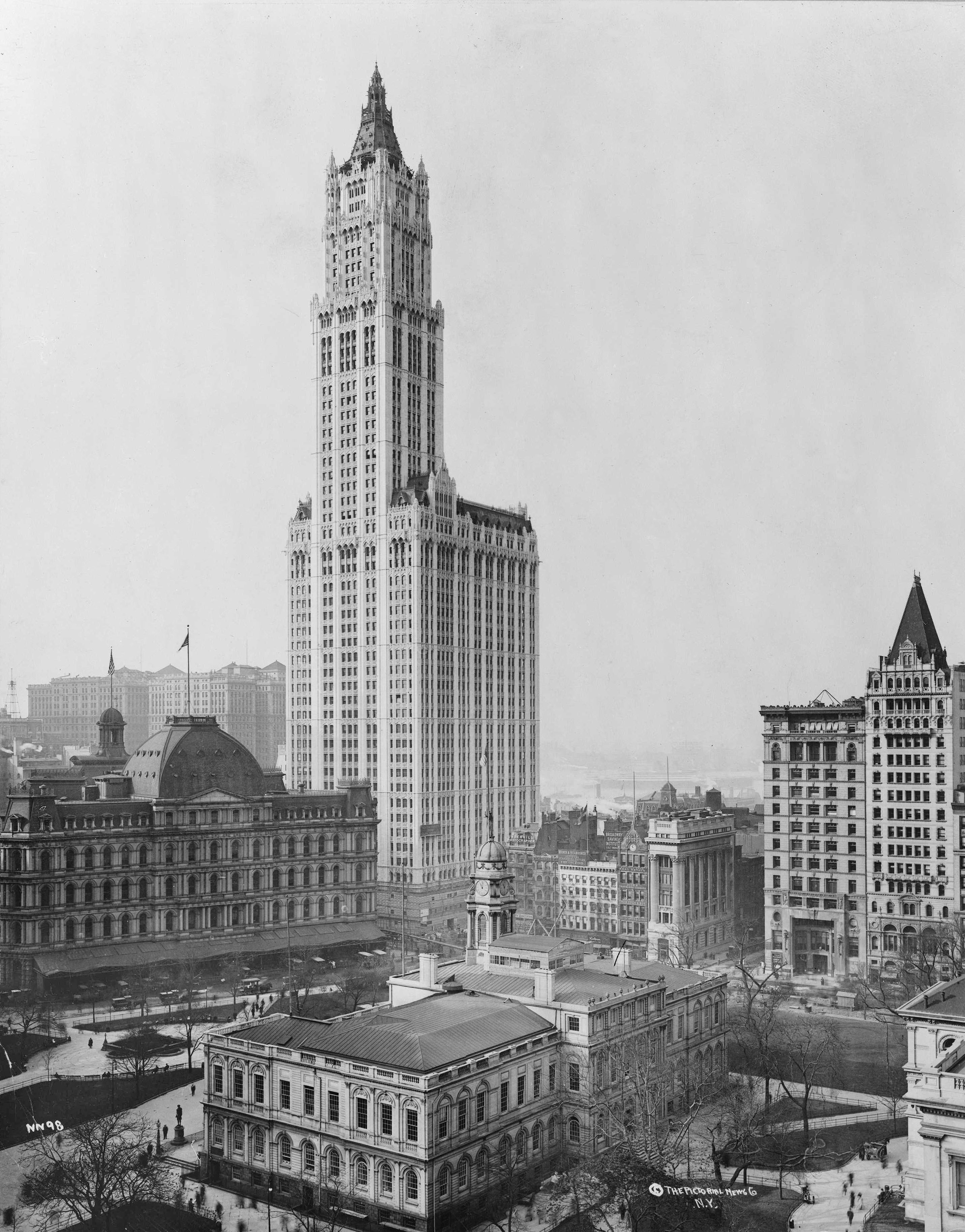
- The Woolworth Building, New York City, c. 1913
- Trade name: Woolworth's or Woolworth & Co
- Type: Public
- Traded as: NYSE: Z (1912–1997); S&P 500 component (until 1997); DJIA component (until 1997)
- Industry: Retail
- Founded: February 22, 1879; 147 years ago, in Utica, New York, US (first stores); February 16, 1905; 121 years ago (corporate entity)
- Founder: Frank Winfield Woolworth
- Defunct: July 17, 1997; 29 years ago
- Successor: Foot Locker
- Headquarters: Woolworth Building, Manhattan, New York City, US
- Area served: United States; Canada; Ireland; Germany; Mexico; United Kingdom
- Key people: F. W. Woolworth (CEO & president); Charles Woolworth (chairman)
- Products: Clothing, footwear, bedding, furniture, jewelry, beauty products, consumer electronics and housewares
- Subsidiaries: Kinney Shoe Company; Richman Brothers; Woolco; Woolworth Athletic Group

The F. W. Woolworth Company (often called Woolworth's or Woolworth) was an American retail conglomerate, best known as a pioneer of the five-and-dime store. It became one of the most successful five-and-dime businesses in the United States and internationally, helping shape the modern retail model used by stores worldwide.

The first store was opened by Frank Winfield Woolworth on February 22, 1879, as Woolworth's Great Five Cent Store in Utica, New York, but was not successful and closed after three months. After searching for a new location, Woolworth opened another store on June 21, 1879, in Lancaster, Pennsylvania, which became his first successful store. He later brought his brother, Charles Sumner Woolworth, into the business. The company then expanded its department store model across North America, becoming one of the biggest retailers of the 20th century. It would then expand internationally, entering the United Kingdom in 1909, Ireland in 1914, Germany in 1927 and Mexico in 1956. In 1963, the company became the parent company of Kinney Shoes, which would create the Foot Locker retailer in 1974.

From the 1980s onwards, the U.S. business faced decline due to hostile competition in the department store market, however the sporting goods division (such as Foot Locker) was still flourishing. In 1982, the Woolworth division in the United Kingdom was divested, which included the Irish division. In July 1997, the Woolworth department store chain closed its final U.S. stores and shifted its focus to sporting goods, renaming itself as Venator Group. In 1997 and 1998, it divested of its remaining Woolworth businesses in Mexico and Germany.

By 2001, Woolworth had moved exclusively into the sporting goods market and adopted its current name, Foot Locker, Inc.

== History ==
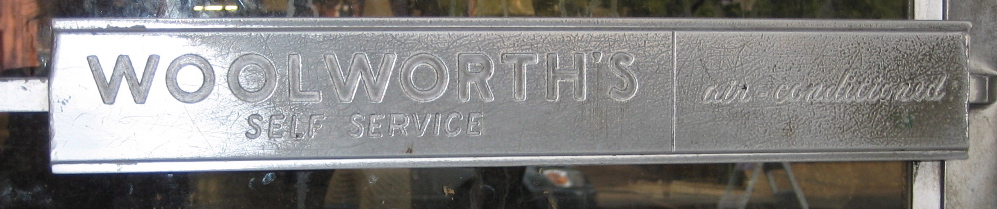
Door handle of a mid-20th century Woolworth's store

=== Origins of F. W. Woolworth Company ===
The F. W. Woolworth Co. had the first five-and-dime stores, which sold discounted general merchandise and fixed price, usually five or ten cents, undercutting the prices of other local merchants. Woolworth, as the stores popularly became known, was one of the first American retailers to put merchandise out for the shopping public to handle and select without the assistance of a sales clerk. Earlier retailers had kept all merchandise behind a counter and customers presented the clerk with a list of items they wished to buy.

After working in Augsbury and Moore dry goods store in Watertown, New York, Frank Winfield Woolworth obtained credit from his former boss, William Moore, along with some savings, to buy merchandise and open the "Woolworth's Great Five Cent Store" in Utica, New York, on February 22, 1879. The store failed and closed in May 1879, after Woolworth earned enough money to pay back William Moore. Woolworth soon made a second attempt, and opened his "Woolworth's Great Five Cent Store", using the same sign, on June 21, 1879, in Lancaster, Pennsylvania.

Lancaster proved a success, and Woolworth opened a second store in Harrisburg, Pennsylvania, in 1879, with his brother Charles Sumner Woolworth as manager. The Harrisburg store closed after a falling-out with the landlord; their next store, in York, Pennsylvania, likewise closed after only three months of operation. Finally, the "5¢ Woolworth Bros. Store" opened in Scranton, Pennsylvania, on November 6, 1880, with Charles as manager. At this location, the "5¢ & 10¢" merchandising model was fully developed, and the store proved a success. Charles bought out Frank's share of the Scranton store in two installments, in January 1881 and 1882, making him the company's first franchisee.

In 1884, Charles partnered with his longtime friend, wholesaler Fred Morgan Kirby, on a location in Wilkes-Barre, Pennsylvania, which they called "Woolworth and Kirby". This location, too, was successful, and the brothers continued persuading family members and other associates to join them in forming a "friendly rival syndicate" of five-and-ten-cent stores. Each of the syndicate chain's stores looked similar inside and out, but operated under its founder's name. Frank Woolworth provided much of the merchandise, encouraging the rivals to club together to maximize their inventory and purchasing power.

=== Rise and expansion ===
By 1904, the syndicate had six chains of affiliated stores operating in the United States and Canada, which began incorporating separately during the next few years. In 1912, however, all 596 stores merged into one corporate entity under the name "F. W. Woolworth Company", which was then incorporated on February 16, 1905. Frank Woolworth served as president; Charles Woolworth, Fred Kirby, Seymour H. Knox I, Earle Charlton, and William Moore each became a director and vice president.

In 1900, Frank Woolworth bought up adjoining properties in a low-rent area of Lancaster. On the newly acquired land, he had a building erected with five floors of offices above a large store, as well as a garden and open-air theater, which soon became the city's social center.

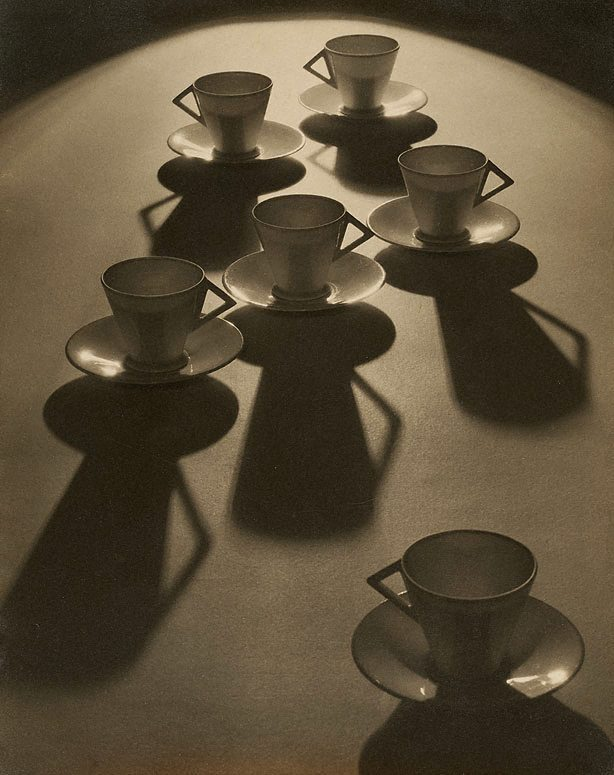
Tea cup ballet, a 1935 photograph by Olive Cotton with some inexpensive cups and saucers from Woolworths

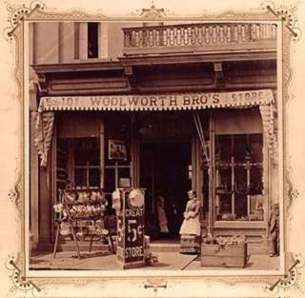
Second successful "Woolworth Bros" store, Scranton, Penn. Later bought by brother Charles, becoming the first "C. S. Woolworth" store, and eventually merged into the F. W. Woolworth Company.

In 1910, Frank Woolworth commissioned the design and construction of the Woolworth Building in New York City. A pioneering early skyscraper, it was designed by American architect Cass Gilbert, a graduate of the MIT architecture school. The building was paid for entirely in cash. It was completed in 1913 and was the tallest building in the world until 1930. It also served as the company's headquarters until the F. W. Woolworth Company's successor, the Venator Group (now Foot Locker), sold it in 1998.

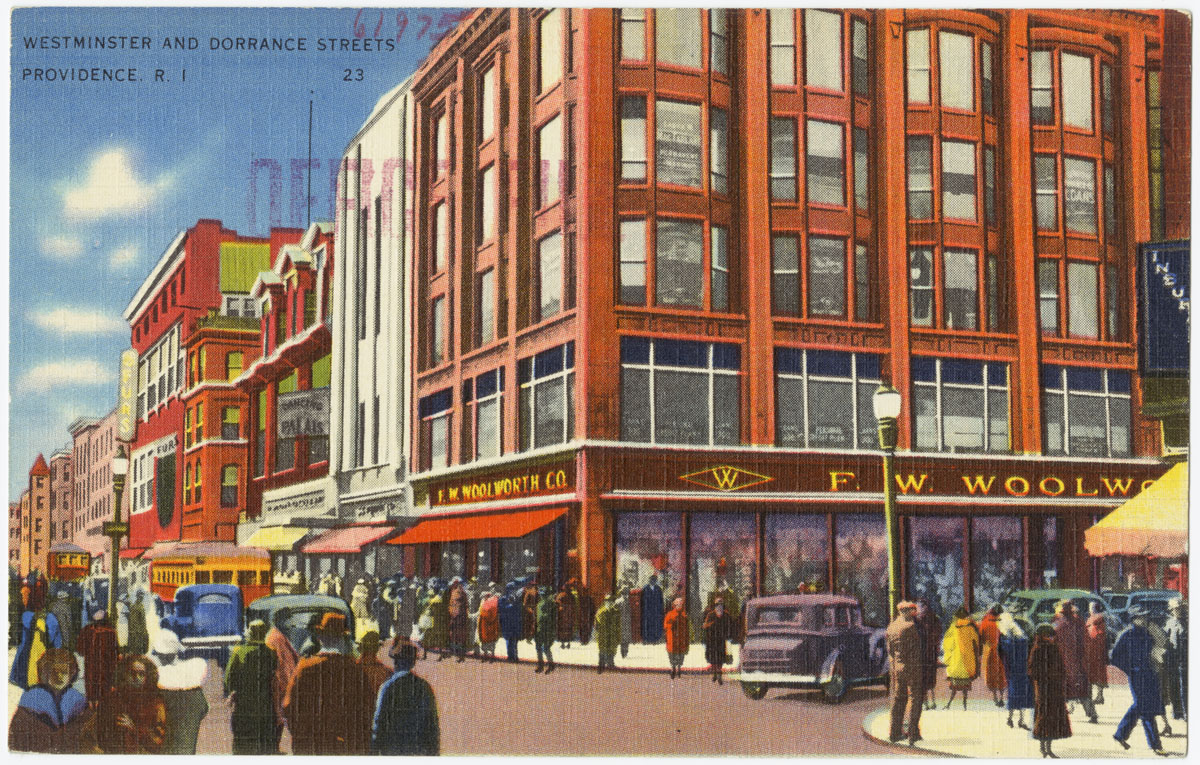
FW Woolworth store in Providence, RI, c. 1930–1945

After Frank Woolworth's 1919 death, his brother Charles took on the role of chairman of the board, and the company's treasurer Hubert T. Parson took over the presidency.

In 1925, the company reported $253 million in sales; in 1926, $239 million.

For many years the company did a strictly "five-and-ten cent" business, but in the spring of 1932 it added a 20-cent line of merchandise. On November 13, 1935, the company's directors decided to discontinue selling-price limits altogether.

The stores eventually incorporated lunch counters after the success of the counters in the first store in the UK in Liverpool. These counters served as general gathering places, a precursor to the modern shopping mall food court. A Woolworth's lunch counter in Greensboro, North Carolina, became the setting for the 1960 Greensboro sit-ins, protesting the company's racial segregation policies in the South, a key event of the Civil Rights Movement.

The Woolworth's concept was widely imitated, and five-and-ten-cent stores (also known as five-and-dime stores or dimestores) became a 20th-century fixture in American downtowns. They would serve as anchors for suburban shopping plazas and shopping malls in the 1950s, 1960s, and 1970s. Criticisms that five-and-dime stores drove local merchants out of business would repeat themselves in the early 21st century, when big-box discount stores became popular.

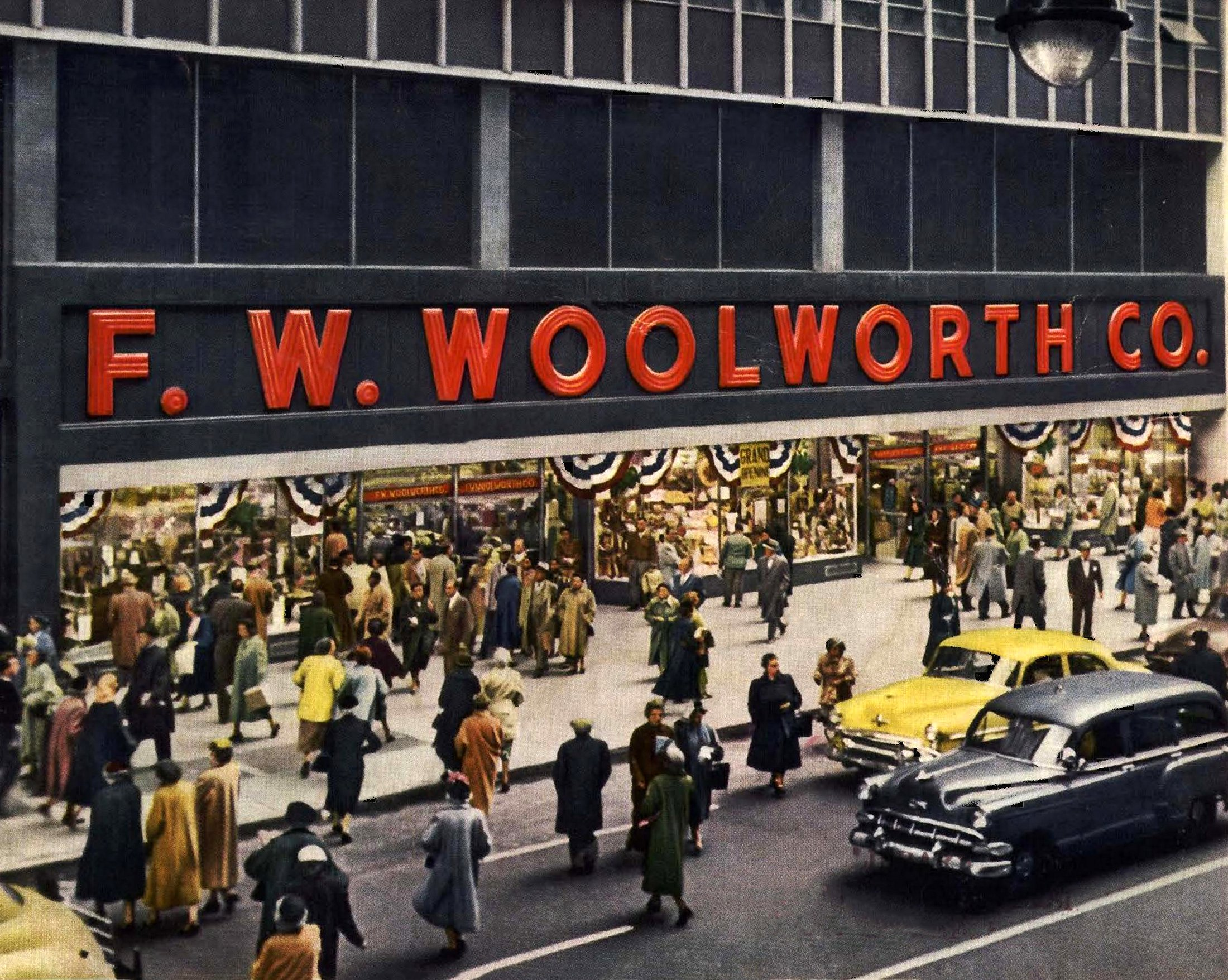
Front of a vintage Woolworth's store on 34th Street in New York City in 1954

=== Diversifications ===
In the 1960s, the five-and-dime concept evolved into the larger discount department store format. In 1962, Woolworth's founded a chain of large, single-floor discount stores called Woolco. In that same year, Woolworth's competitors opened similar retail chains that sold merchandise at a discount: the S.S. Kresge Company opened Kmart, Dayton's opened Target, and Sam Walton opened his first Wal-Mart store.

The following year, in 1963, Woolworth expanded into the shoe store business with the purchase of Kinney Shoe Corporation, which led to the founding of the sporting goods store Foot Locker in 1974; the company would specialise in sporting goods and exclusively focus on sporting goods by 2001.

By Woolworth's 100th anniversary in 1979, it had become the largest department store chain in the world, according to the Guinness Book of World Records.

During the 1980s, the company began expansion into many different specialty store formats, including Afterthoughts (which sold jewelry and other accessories for women), Northern Reflections (which sold cold-weather outerwear), Rx Place (later sold to Phar-Mor), and Champs Sports.

By 1989, the company was pursuing an aggressive strategy of multiple specialty store formats targeted at enclosed shopping malls. The idea was that if a particular concept failed at a given mall, the company could quickly replace it with a different concept. The company aimed for ten stores in each of the country's major shopping malls, but this never came to pass, as Woolworth never developed that many successful specialty store formats.

Also attempted was a revision of the classic Woolworth store model into Woolworth Express, a small, mall-oriented variant which was dubbed "a specialty variety store'', stocked with everyday convenience items such as health and beauty aids, greeting cards, snack foods, cleaning supplies and school supplies (somewhat like the non-pharmacy, mall-based locations of CVS/pharmacy and other drug store chains).

=== Decline ===
Woolworths at 3200 Lankershim Boulevard, North Hollywood, Los Angeles in 1977

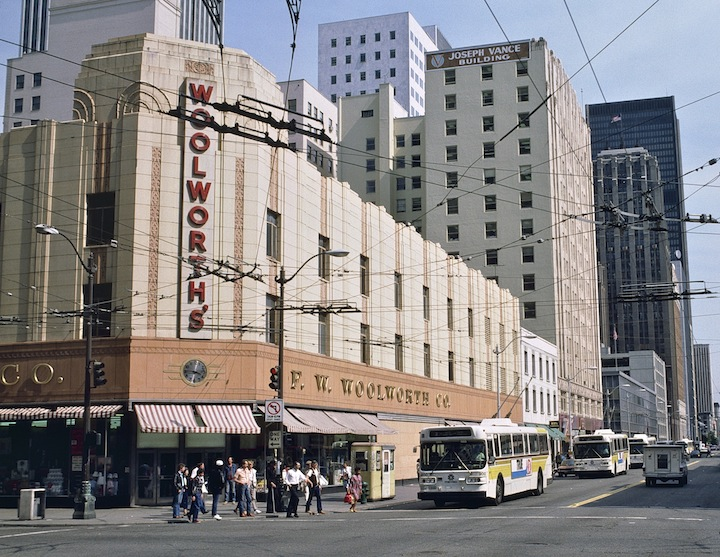
The Woolworth's store in downtown Seattle in the 1980s

The growth and expansion of the company contributed to its downfall. The Woolworth company moved away from its five-and-dime roots and placed less emphasis on its department store chain as it focused on its specialty stores. Still, the company was unable to compete with other chains that had eroded its market share.

While it was a success in Canada, the Woolco chain closed in the United States in 1983. Europe's largest F. W. Woolworth store, in Manchester, England (one of two in the city centre), suffered a fire in May 1979. Despite the store being rebuilt even larger and up to the latest fire codes, the negative stories in the press and loss of lives in the fire sealed its fate; it ultimately closed in 1986. During the rebuilding and partly as a result of the bad press, the British operation was separated from the parent company as Woolworths plc. This proved fortuitous, as the brand subsequently lasted a full twelve years longer in the United Kingdom than it did in the United States.

On October 15, 1993, Woolworth's embarked on a restructuring plan that included closing half of its 800-plus general merchandise stores in the United States and converting its Canadian stores to a closeout division named The Bargain! Shop. Woolco and Woolworth survived in Canada until 1994, when the company sold the majority of the Woolco stores to Wal-Mart. The Woolco stores that Wal-Mart did not purchase were either converted to The Bargain! Shop, sold to Zellers or closed permanently. Approximately 100 Woolworth stores in Canada were rebranded as The Bargain! Shop, and the remainder closed.

Amid the decline of the signature stores, Woolworth began focusing on the sale of athletic goods. On January 30, 1997, the company acquired the mail order catalog athletic retailer Eastbay.

On March 17, 1997, Wal-Mart replaced Woolworth's as a component of the Dow Jones Industrial Average. Analysts at the time cited the lower prices of the large discount stores and the expansion of supermarket grocery stores – which had begun to stock merchandise also sold by five-and-dime stores – as contributors to Woolworth's decline in the late 20th century. Woolworth's announced that same year it would be closing its remaining department stores in the United States on July 17.

=== Rebranding and epilogue ===
After the closure of its department stores, F. W. Woolworth Company had changed its corporate name to Venator Group, Inc. on June 12, 1998. The name "Venator" means "sportsman" in Latin. In 1999, Venator moved from the Woolworth Building in New York City to offices on 34th Street. Then on October 20, 2001, after selling off its non-athletic business (including a number of Burger King franchises), the company changed names again; taking the name of its top retail performer and became Foot Locker, Inc., which Woolworth started in 1974 under Kinney Shoes. Foot Locker, Inc., is the legal continuation of the original Woolworth; it retains Woolworth's pre-1997 stock price history.

As part of celebrating F. W. Woolworth's centennial on the New York Stock Exchange on June 26, 2012, a news release featured a 1912 Woolworth's store and a 2012 Foot Locker store.

In 2023, Foot Locker announced plan to close up to 400 low performing stores by 2026. Some of them were once Woolworth's.

On May 15, 2025, Dick's Sporting Goods, a sporting good store and rival to Foot Locker, announced that it would acquire the Foot Locker, Inc. company as well as its brands, including Foot Locker, for $2.4 billion.

== Influence on popular culture ==
Logo used during the 1960s and '70s

- Woolworth was the pioneer of "five-and-dime"–style retailing.
- In 1880, Woolworth first sold manufactured Christmas tree ornaments, which proved extremely popular.
- In 1929, in Atlantic City, New Jersey, Sam Foster (founder of Foster Grant eyewear) sold sunglasses from his counter in Woolworth's on the city's famous boardwalk, which became a great hit with the sunbathing public.
- Paul Terry, founder of the Terrytoons Cartoon Studio, once said "Let Walt Disney be the Tiffany's, I want to be the Woolworth's".
- On February 1, 1960, four African-American students from North Carolina Agricultural and Technical State University (NC A&T) started the Greensboro sit-ins at a "whites only" lunch counter in the Greensboro, North Carolina store. (The store is now a museum.)
- On February 27, 1960, in Nashville, Tennessee, an integrated student-led movement from nearby black colleges, including Fisk University, American Baptist College, and Tennessee A&I (now Tennessee State), drew more than 200 protestors to the lunch counters at Woolworth, Kress, McClellan, and Walgreens across the street, resulting in national media attention after the students' nonviolent tactics were met with violent backlash from white citizens. Among the protestors arrested was future US Congressman John Lewis, who participated in the sit-in at the lunch counter at Woolworth. The building functioned as a diner, Woolworth's on Fifth, for several years after the original store's closing and is now being converted into an entertainment theater.
- On May 28, 1963, 14 activists – including Tougaloo College chaplain, Reverend Ed King and professors John Salter Jr. and Lois Chaffee (who were white), and students Pearlena Lewis, Anne Moody (who later published Coming of Age in Mississippi), and Memphis Norman (who were black), and Joan Trumpauer (who was white) – protested Jim Crow segregation via a sit-in at Woolworth's "whites only" lunch counter in Jackson, Mississippi. Bill Minor, then the Mississippi correspondent covering civil rights events for the New Orleans Times-Picayune and who was there that day, says the Jackson Woolworth's sit-in was "the signature event of the protest movement in Jackson. The first one there was with real violence." The following year, the Civil Rights Act of 1964 was passed into law.
- In 1976, David Bowie memorably called his look, "a cross between Nijinsky and Woolworth's."
- On folk singer Nanci Griffith's 1988 live album, One Fair Summer Evening, the song "Love at the Five and Dime" includes an extended introduction that reminisces about Woolworth stores.
- A memorable scene in the Coen brothers' 2000 film O Brother, Where Art Thou?, set in rural Mississippi in 1937, entails George Clooney's character being physically thrown out of an F. W. Woolworth Co. store and admonished by the manager, "And stay out o' the Woolsworth!"
- Following Woolworth's dissolution, a Woolworth's building remained in operation (albeit as an antique store) in Bakersfield, California, and included a diner with similar offerings of the former brand. Both the store and diner closed in 2022 for renovations following a sale of the building. In 2025, it was announced that the diner would reopen on October 25th.
- The 2nd season of The Red Green Show featured a character named Murray Woolworth, played by Ed Sahely, who ran a variety store called Murray's Variety, where he always sold useless junk and faulty inventions and devices, enforced a strict "no return-no refunds-no exchange" policy, and was constantly scheming ways to cheat Lodge members out of their money as a result of his shady and unethical business practices.

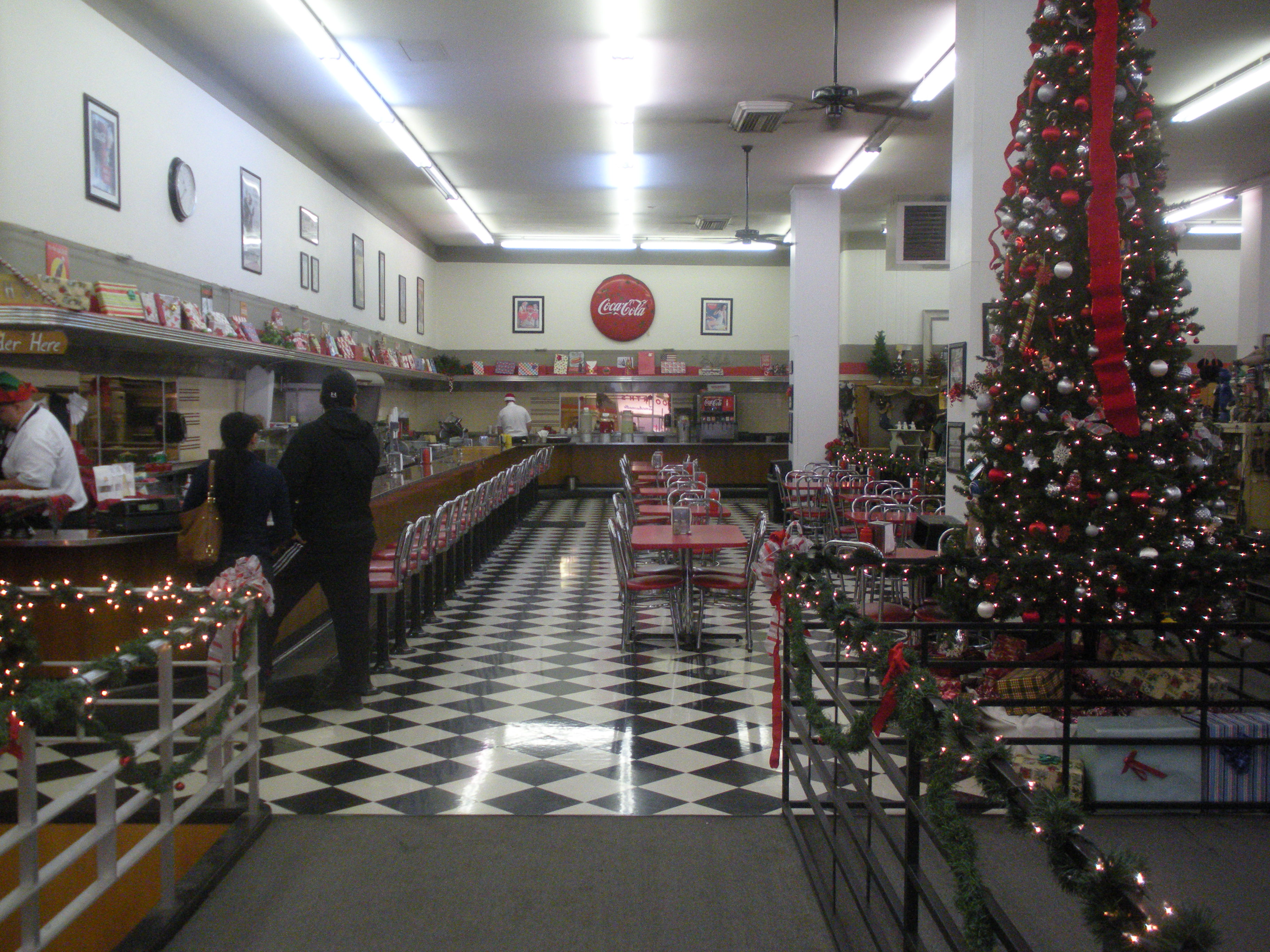
Former Woolworth's Diner in Bakersfield, California.

== Lunch counter sit-ins ==
On February 1, 1960, four black students sat down at a segregated lunch counter in a Greensboro, North Carolina, Woolworth's store. They were refused service, touching off six months of sit-ins and economic boycotts that became a landmark event in the civil rights movement. In 1993, an eight-foot section of the lunch counter was moved to the Smithsonian Institution and the store site now contains a civil rights museum, which had its grand opening on Monday, February 1, 2010, the 50th anniversary of the beginning of the sit-ins.

Imitation sit-ins also occurred in other cities where there were segregated lunch counters at Woolworth's. In Roanoke, Virginia, on August 27, 1960, two women and a boy "...sat at the lunch counter and ordered a slice of pie, a soda and a sundae, all under the watchful eyes of the biracial committee which had organized the event." The names of the three black customers were not reported at the time, and are now unknown. While the incident was uneventful, other sit-ins were completed, also without incident, at 17 other segregated lunch counters in Roanoke.

There were at least 3 sit-ins in Florida Woolworth's locations; two in March 1960, in Tampa and Sarasota, and in July 1963 in St. Augustine, Florida.

== Presidents ==
- Frank Winfield Woolworth (1852–1919) – founder
- Hubert Templeton Parson (1919–1932)
- Byron D. Miller (1932–1935)
- Charles Deyo (1935–1946)
- Alfred Cornwell (1946–1954)
- James T. Leftwich (1954–1958)
- Robert C. Kirkwood (1958–1965)
- Lester A. Burcham (1965–1970)
- John S. Roberts (1970–1975)
- Edward F. Gibbons (1975–1978)
- W. Robert Harris (1978–?)
- Robert L. Jennings 1984–1987 – President of flagship division, but not of corporation
- Frederick E. Hennig (1987–1995)
- Jack Adams (1993–1994) – interim CEO for restructuring
- Roger N. Farah (1994–2000) – oversaw company's name change to Venator in 1997
- Matthew D. Serra (2001–2009) – oversaw company's name change to Foot Locker in 2001
- Kenneth C. Hicks (2009–2014)
- Richard A. Johnson (2014–2022)
- Mary N. Dillon (2022–2025)
- Ann Freeman (2025–present) – appointed after Dick's Sporting Goods acquisition

In later years the chairman rather than the president was frequently the chief executive officer. Gibbons (1919–1982) succeeded Burcham (1913–1987) as chairman-CEO in 1978 and died in office, succeeded by vice chairman John W. Lynn (1921–2013) who was succeeded in 1986 by president (since 1983, replacing Richard L. Anderson (d. 2015)) Harold Sells. Farah joined the company as chairman and CEO in December 1994, and Hennig was replaced by Dale W. Hilpert as president in May 1995. That changed after the company's transition into a sporting goods company.

== Non-American retail users of the Woolworth name ==
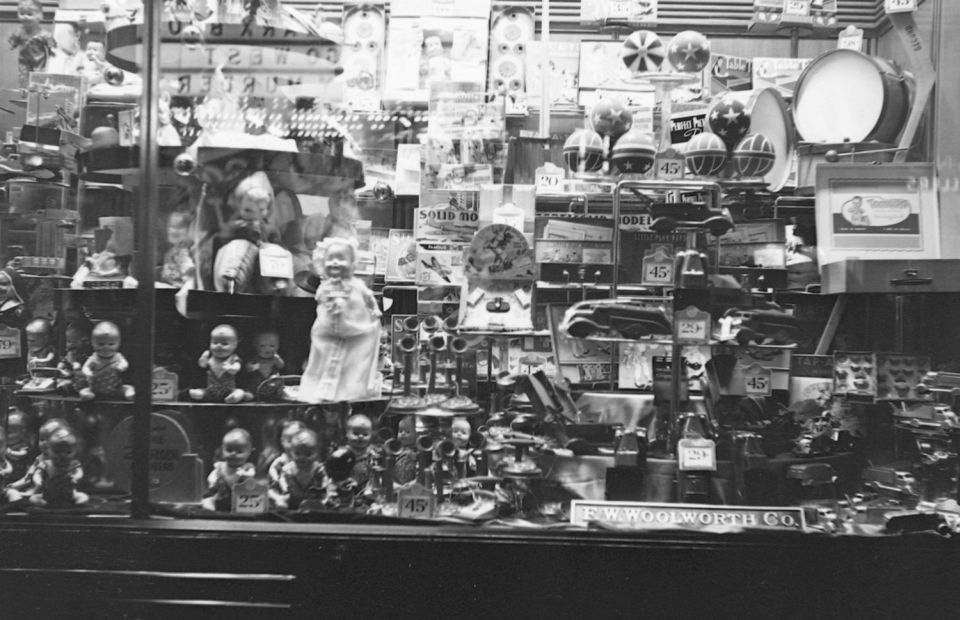
A Christmas toy display at a Woolworth store in Montreal, Quebec, Canada, in 1941

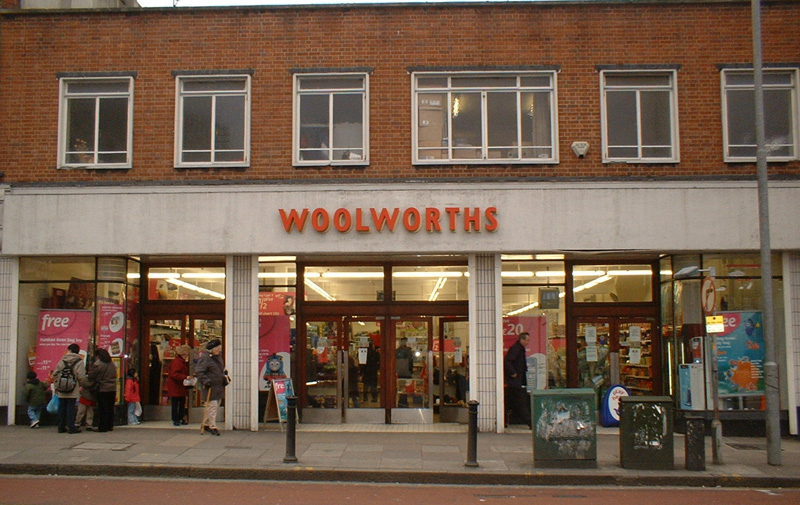
A Woolworths store in the UK, 2004

=== Former F. W. Woolworth subsidiaries ===
==== Currently in business ====
- Deutsche Woolworth GmbH & Company OHG (founded in 1927), the German unit of F. W. Woolworth has operated independently since 1998; it owns the rights of the Woolworth trademark in continental Europe, and in 2021 acquired the British Woolworths brand.
- Woolworth Mexico operates a chain of small variety stores in Mexico, sold in December 1997 to Control Dinamico S.A. by Foot Locker Inc and is now a subsidiary of Grupo Comercial Control, S.A. de C.V.

==== Defunct ====
- Woolworth Canada was the Canadian unit of F. W. Woolworth founded in the 1920s and based in North York, Ontario. In addition to the Woolworth stores, other banners of Woolworth Canada included Woolco, The Bargain! Shop, Kinney, Foot Locker, Northern Reflections, Northern Getaway, Northern Traditions, Silk & Satin and Randy River. The division continued to be called Woolworth Canada even after the last stores under the Woolworth nameplate disappeared from Canada in 1994. Woolworth Canada was eventually renamed Venator Group Canada in 1998 and finally Foot Locker Canada in 2001.
- Woolworths (United Kingdom) originally was the British unit of F. W. Woolworth, but operated independently as a separate company from 1982, running stores in the UK, Isle of Man, Jersey and Guernsey. It also had interests in other UK retailers, such as B&Q, Comet, Superdrug and Screwfix as part of the Kingfisher group. On November 26, 2008, Woolworths Group plc announced that they were in too much debt to maintain their outgoing payments. The remaining British Woolworths stores closed by January 6, 2009, with the loss of almost 30,000 jobs. Shop Direct Group purchased the UK Woolworths and operated it as an online entity until 2015. The defunct UK brand is now owned by Woolworth Deutschland.

=== Others ===
- Woolworths Group is the largest retail corporation in Australia, operating a variety of supermarket and other retail chains in Australia and New Zealand. The name "Woolworths" was legally taken to capitalize on the F. W. Woolworth name, since they did not do business in Australia and had not registered the trademark there, but is in no other way connected to the US or UK Woolworths.
- Woolworths is an upmarket retail chain in South Africa selling goods of a comparable nature to Marks & Spencer stores in the United Kingdom. The South African company also operates stores in Botswana, Eswatini, Ghana, Kenya, Lesotho, Mauritius, Mozambique, Namibia and Tanzania, they previously operated stores in Bahrain, Nigeria, Oman, Qatar, Uganda, United Arab Emirates, Zambia, and Zimbabwe.
- Woolworth's on Prince William-Henry Street in Bridgetown, Barbados, operates independently, having split from the British branch in 1982. It was established in the 1950s, stocking goods shipped from Britain.

== See also ==
- List of Woolworth buildings
- F. W. Woolworth Co. v. Contemporary Arts, Inc.
