= Eastbay =

US sporting goods retailer

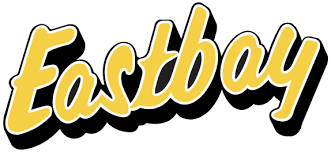
- Company type: Subsidiary of Foot Locker
- Industry: Direct mail catalog and internet supplier of athletic footwear & apparel.
- Founded: 1980; 45 years ago
- Founders: Richard Gering; Art Juedes
- Defunct: 2023
- Fate: Merged into Champs Sports
- Headquarters: Wausau, Wisconsin, United States
- Website: www.eastbay.com

Eastbay was an American supplier of athletic footwear, apparel and sports equipment, selling through direct mail and the internet. In 1997, it became a subsidiary of the F. W. Woolworth Company, later known as Foot Locker, Inc.

== History ==
The company was founded in 1980 by Richard Gering and Art Juedes. With about $7,000 worth of running shoes, they set up shoe clinics near their hometown of Wausau, Wisconsin. At each stop they sold their shoes and provided price lists.

In 1983, they developed a catalog for track and field and baseball shoes. In 1988, phone operators were hired to take orders. In 1989, the company began a team sales division and the following year, created and produced its first in-house team sales catalog. At the time Eastbay's call center, shipping and creative departments occupied just under one city block.

Eastbay established its own clothing brand in 1990, offering jackets, pants, shorts, underwear, socks and tops in various sports teams' colors and styles, with the Eastbay logo.

On September 29, 1995, Eastbay made an initial public offering on the NASDAQ stock exchange. Two years later, shareholders sold the company to F. W. Woolworth Company.

In July 1997, Eastbay moved its downtown corporate operation and retail store to a larger space on Wausau's near-west side. Three months later, it combined the shipping department and various warehouses into a new 500,000-square-foot (46,000 m^{2}) distribution center on the outskirts of Wausau. In March 1998, Eastbay converted its marketing website into an e-commerce site. Two additional call centers were subsequently opened in Oshkosh, Wisconsin, and Green Bay, Wisconsin. Juedes and Gering retired on June 30, 1999.

Eastbay's parent company, F.W. Woolworth Company, also underwent a major revision, being reorganized as Venator Group in 1997 and changing its name in 2001 to Foot Locker, Inc.

In 2022, Foot Locker announced that Eastbay and its distribution center in Wausau would permanently close during the first half of 2023, resulting in 210 layoffs. The Eastbay website was shut down and merged into the Champs Sports banner on January 13, 2023.
