= Woolworth (Mexico) =

Mexican chain of retail department stores

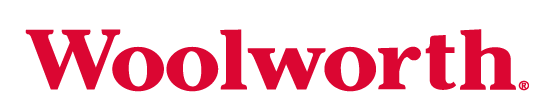

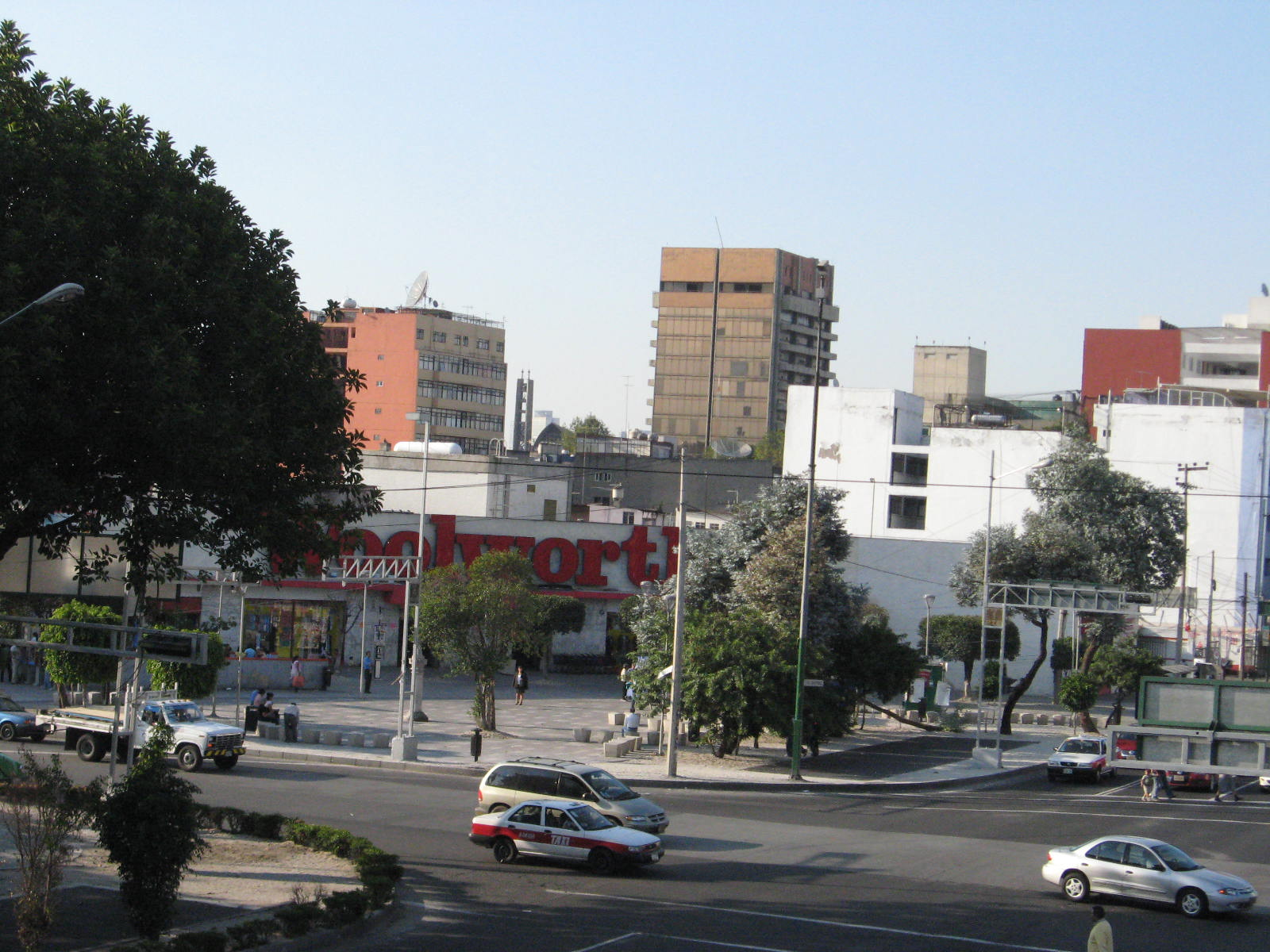
- Founded: April 1956; 70 years ago
- Number of locations: 36 (2020)
- Parent: Grupo Comercial Control (1997-present)
- Website: delsol.com.mx

Woolworth (previously known as Woolworth de Mexico and Woolworth Mexicana) is a chain of retail department stores in Mexico which were founded by the F. W. Woolworth Company of the United States. It became independent in a management buyout by the Mexican executives in 1997. The company is now part of Grupo Comercial Control, a holding company with operations in retailing.
