= Foot Locker =

American multinational footwear and sportswear retail company

Foot Locker, Inc.
- Type: Subsidiary
- Traded as: NYSE: FL
- Industry: Clothing
- Predecessor: F. W. Woolworth Company
- Founded: September 12, 1974; 52 years ago
- Founders: Santiago Lopez
- Headquarters: 112 West 34th Street, New York City, New York 10120, U.S.
- Number of locations: 2,523 stores (2023)
- Area served: Worldwide
- Key people: Ann Freeman (President & CEO)
- Brands: Foot Locker; Kids Foot Locker; Lady Foot Locker; House of Hoops
- Revenue: ▼US$8.15 billion (2023)
- Operating income: ▼US$142 million (2023)
- Net income: ▼US$−330 million (2023)
- Total assets: ▼US$6.87 billion (2023)
- Total equity: ▼US$2.89 billion (2023)
- Number of employees: 46,846 (2023)
- Parent: Dick's Sporting Goods
- Subsidiaries: Champs Sports; WSS; Runner's Point; Sidestep
- Website: footlocker.com

Foot Locker, Inc. is an American multinational retailer of footwear, sportswear, urban youth apparel and accessories owned by Dick's Sporting Goods. It is headquartered in Midtown Manhattan, New York City, and operates in over 40 countries.

Although established as a brand in 1974 and as a separate company in 1988, Foot Locker's roots date to 1879, as it is a successor corporation to the F. W. Woolworth Company ("Woolworth's"), which was incorporated in 1905 and changed its name to Foot Locker in 2001, as many of its freestanding stores were Kinney Shoes and Woolworth's locations. The company operates the eponymous "Foot Locker" chain of athletic footwear retail outlets (along with "Kids Foot Locker" and "Lady Foot Locker" stores), and other athletic-based divisions including Champs Sports, Footaction USA, House of Hoops, and Eastbay/Footlocker.com, which owns the rights to Final-Score. The company is also famous for its employees' uniforms at its flagship Foot Locker chain, resembling those of referees.

Foot Locker located inside West Town Mall, Knoxville, Tennessee

According to the company's filings with the SEC, as of 2023, Foot Locker, Inc. had 2,523 primarily mall-based stores in the United States, Canada, Europe, and Asia. Nearly 70% of its products are from Nike.

In May 2025, Dick's Sporting Goods announced its intention to acquire Foot Locker for $2.4 billion. The sale was completed in September 2025.

== History ==
Foot Locker main wordmark used since 1988

Logos for the Foot Locker brand, used since 2020.

=== Early years ===
In 1963, the F. W. Woolworth Company purchased the Kinney Shoe Corporation and operated it as a subsidiary. In the 1960s, Kinney branched into specialty shoe stores, including Stylco in 1967, Susie Casuals in 1968, and Foot Locker on September 12, 1974. The first Foot Locker opened in the Puente Hills Mall in City of Industry, California. Woolworth also diversified its portfolio of specialty stores in the 1980s, including Afterthoughts, Northern Reflections, Rx Place, and Champs Sports. By 1989, the company pursued an aggressive strategy of multiple specialty store formats targeted at enclosed shopping malls. The idea was that if a particular concept failed at a given mall, the company could quickly replace it with a different concept. The company aimed for ten stores in each of the country's major shopping malls, but this never came to pass as Woolworth never developed that many successful specialty store formats.

In April 1989, the F.W. Woolworth Company reincorporated as a separate company, known as the Woolworth Corporation in the state of New York. The Woolworth Corporation was responsible for the operations of the Foot Locker stores, among the other specialty chains operated by Woolworth's. One of its first moves was the acquisition of Champs Sports and renaming itself the Woolworth Athletic Group.

During the 1980s and 1990s, the F.W. Woolworth Company's flagship department store chain fell into decline, ultimately culminating in the closure of the last stores operating under the name of Woolworth's in the United States in 1997. Deciding to continue aggressive expansion into the athletic business in the following years, the company acquired Eastbay in 1997, which was the largest athletic catalog retailer in the United States, as well as subsequent purchases of regional storefront retailers Sporting Goods (purchased in 1997) and The Athletic Fitters (purchased in 1998). After 1997, Wal-Mart replaced Woolworth in the Dow Jones average. The Woolworth Corporation remained the parent company of Foot Locker, and in June 1998 it changed its name to "Venator Group, Inc." By the 1990s, Foot Locker was responsible for more than 70 percent of Kinney Shoe Corp. sales, while traditional shoe retailer Kinney was in decline. Venator announced shuttering of the remaining Kinney Shoe and Footquarters stores on September 16, 1998; this decision had been preceded by the closure of all Canadian Kinney Shoe stores that April. Matthew Serra became president and COO in 2000.

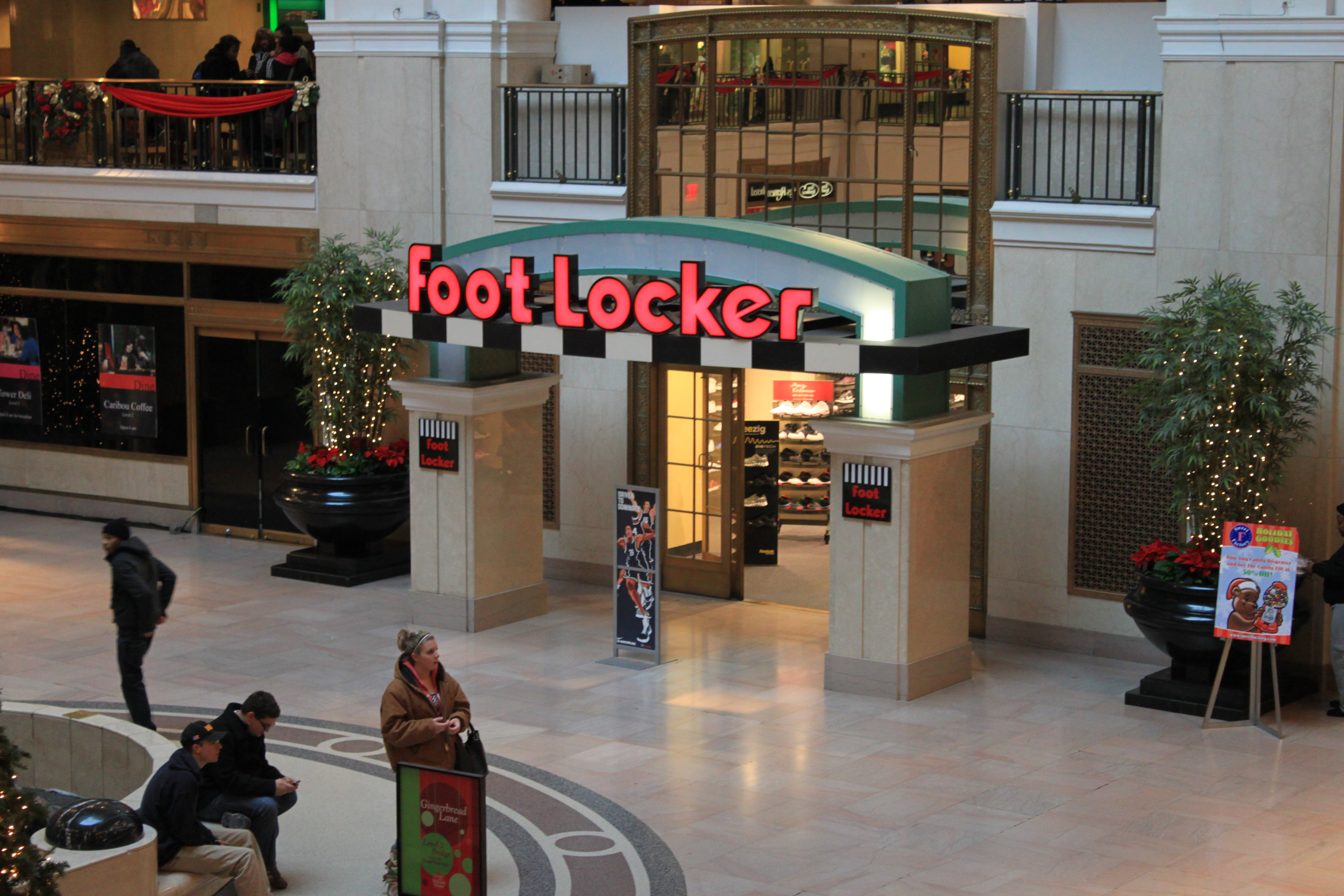
Former Foot Locker outlet, Tower City Center, Cleveland, Ohio

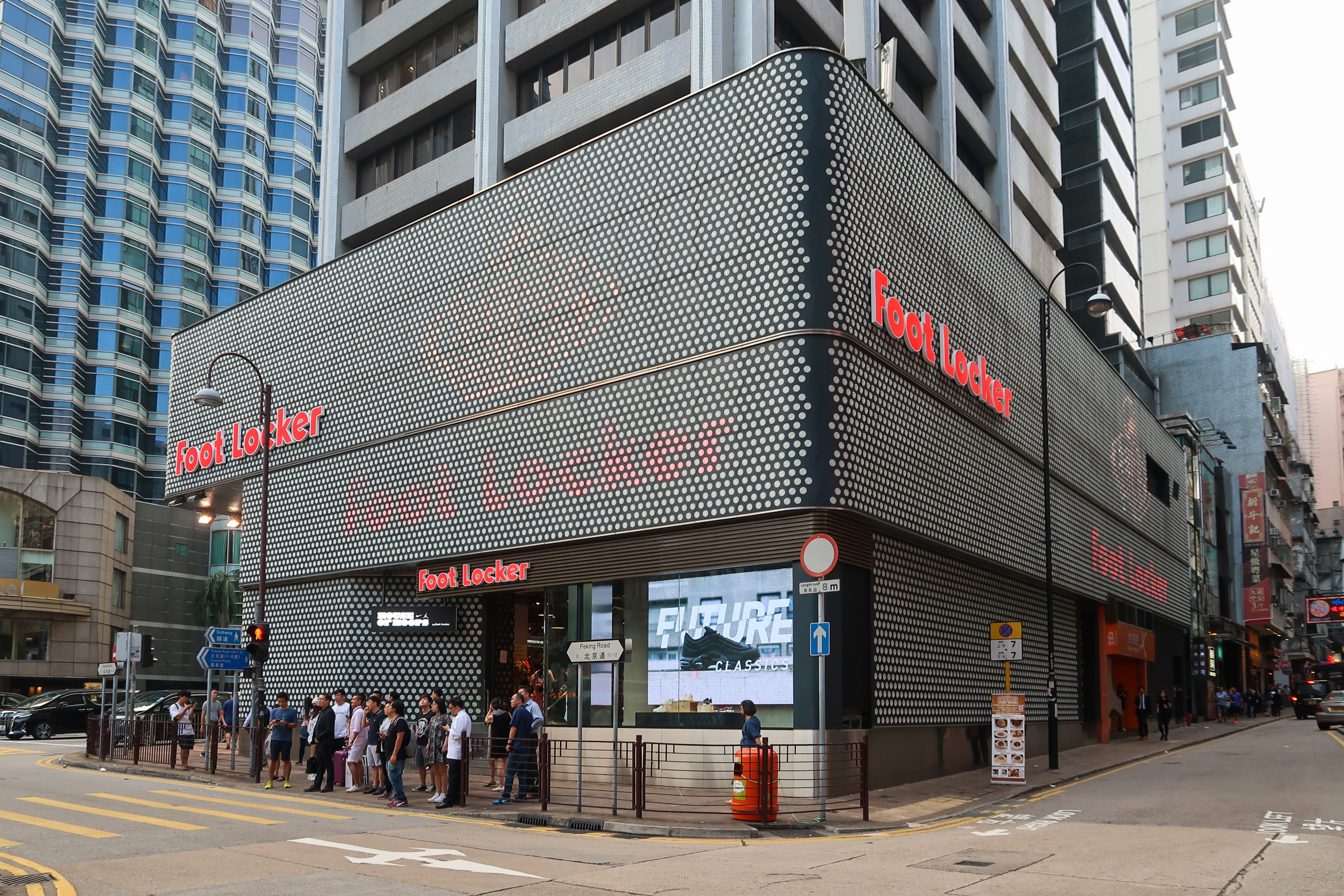
A Foot Locker flagship location in Tsim Sha Tsui, Hong Kong

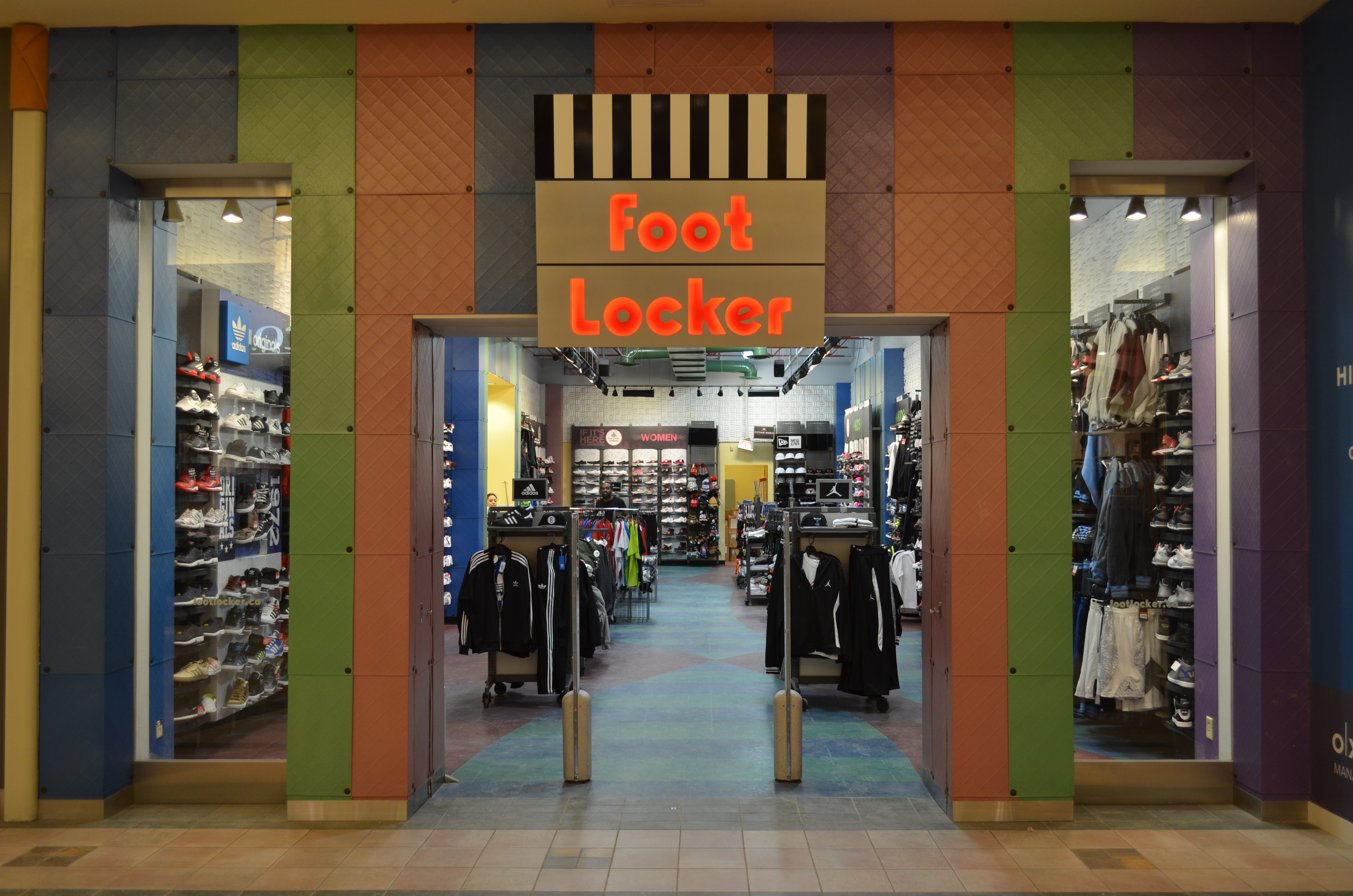
Foot Locker outlet, Hillcrest Mall, Richmond Hill, Ontario

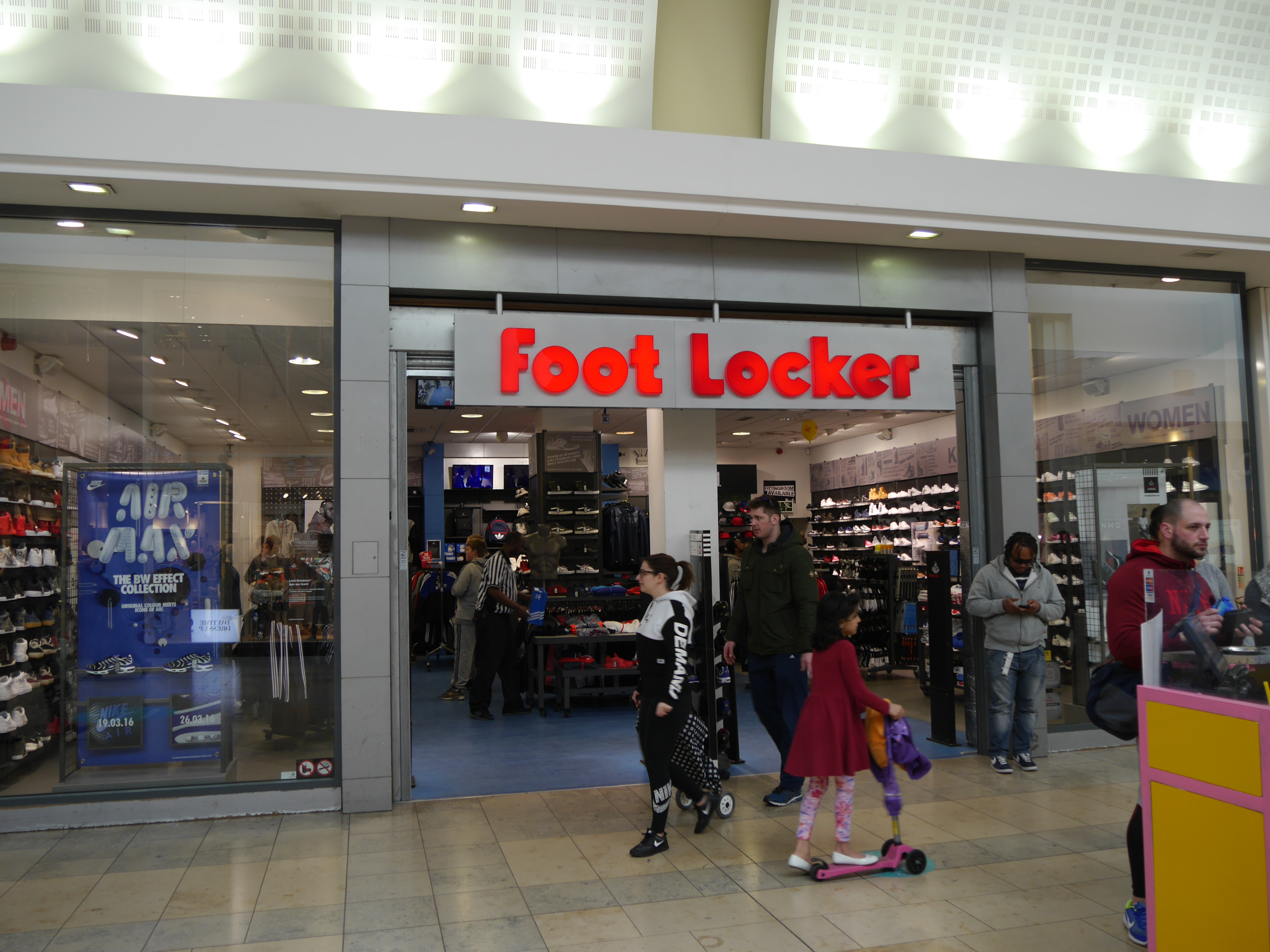
Foot Locker outlet, Southside Wandsworth, London

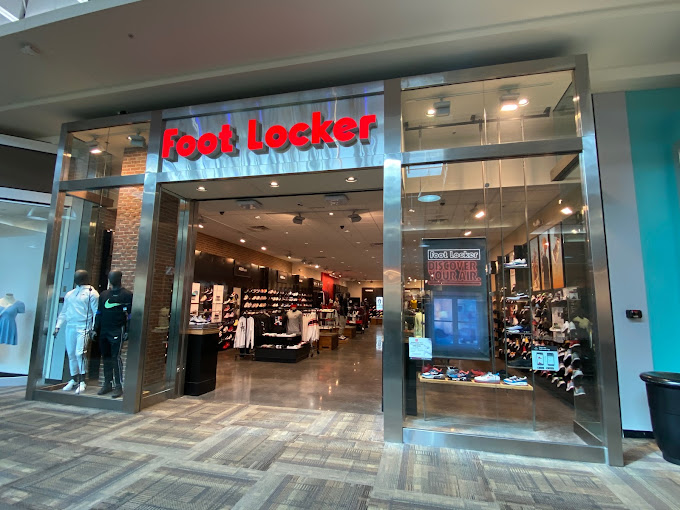
Foot Locker located inside Southern Park Mall, Boardman, Ohio.

=== Rebranding as Foot Locker ===
As the "Foot Locker" brand had become the Woolworth/Venator company's top performing line, on November 2, 2001, Venator changed its name to Foot Locker, Inc. At that time, Serra became CEO of the company. In 2004, he was also named chairman. In the early 2000s, the majority of Foot Locker stores were renovated and standardized. On November 19, 2004, Foot Locker announced that its quarterly profit rose 19 percent, helped by stronger sales.

In 2004, Foot Locker acquired the Footaction USA brand and approximately 350 stores from Footstar for $350 million (~$571 million in 2025). On April 14, 2004, Foot Locker Inc. announced that it agreed to buy about 350 Footaction stores from bankrupt Footstar Inc. for $160 million (~$261 million in 2025) to expand in urban areas.

On January 10, 2005, the company announced that Nick Grayston was promoted to President and Chief Executive Officer of its Foot Locker U.S. division, succeeding Tim Finn, who retired from the company.

In 2007, Foot Locker joined with schoolPAX to launch the Foot Locker School Rewards Program, designed to provide charitable donations to schools who sign up and shop at Foot Locker with a custom-coded key tag or school code. Also that year, Foot Locker attempted a revival of the Footquarters name and store format, but put an end to the idea afte only 3 months.

In 2008, Foot Locker purchased CCS, a skateboarding equipment retailer, from Alloy for $103 million in cash. In August 2009, Ken Hicks succeeded Matt Serra as CEO.

In 2011, Foot Locker joined DoSomething.Org for the Foot Locker Scholar Athletes program, which honors high school athletes for demonstrating academic excellence and flexing their hearts on their sports teams and in their communities.

On June 26, 2012, Foot Locker celebrated the 100th anniversary of the first stock offering made by its predecessor, the F. W. Woolworth Company, on the New York Stock Exchange by ringing the Closing Bell for the trading day.

In 2013, the company acquired the German retailer Runners Point Group.

After not meeting corporate expectations, Foot Locker planned to close its CCS unit but sold it to Daddies Board Shop in 2014. In December 2014, Ken Hicks stepped down as CEO. He was succeeded by COO Richard Johnson.

Foot Locker has steadily risen in Fortune 500 rank, from 446 in 2011 to 363 in 2018. Foot Locker recorded a record turnover of 7.151 million dollars at the end of the fiscal year 2015.

In 2019, Foot Locker invested $100 million (~$124 million in 2025) in GOAT, an online resale marketplace for sneakers. Foot Locker was heavily damaged and looted in the riotings, with two locations destroyed by arson, following the George Floyd protests in Minneapolis–Saint Paul in May 2020.

By November 2020, Czech billionaire Daniel Křetínský's holding company Vesa Equity Investment Sarl became the largest shareholder of Foot Locker with a 10% holding by buying Macy's stake.

In 2021, Foot Locker acquired Los Angeles–based athletic retailer WSS and Tokyo-based Atmos.

In 2022, Foot Locker announced it would aim to achieve net zero emissions by 2050. In September 2022, Mary Dillon was named CEO, replacing the retiring Richard Johnson.

A Foot Locker outlet was looted in the June–July 2023 France riots following the police shooting of Moroccan/Algerian Nahel Merzouk.

A Foot Locker outlet was looted in the November 2023 Dublin, Ireland riots following the stabbings by Algerian Riad Bouchaker.

In 2023, Footlocker announced plan to close up to 400 low performing stores by 2026.

=== Acquisition by Dick's Sporting Goods ===
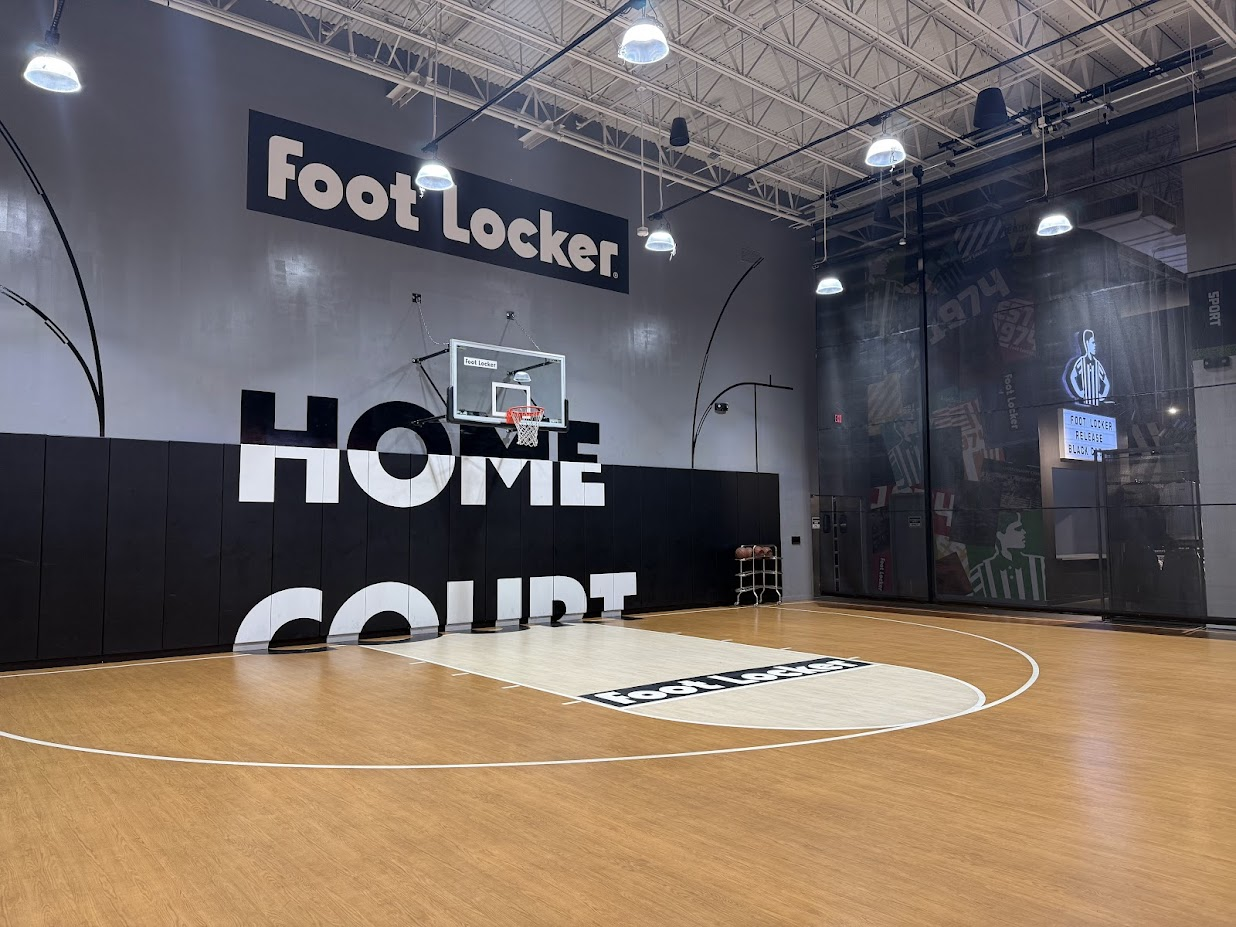
Foot Locker Basketball court at The Crossings, Florida

On May 15, 2025, Dick's Sporting Goods announced that it would acquire the Foot Locker, Inc. company as well as its brands, including Foot Locker, for $2.4 billion. The deal closed on September 8, 2025. After the acquisition, Dillon was replaced by former Nike executive Ann Freeman as president and CEO.

== Controversies ==
On February 12, 1999, a federal jury in Austin awarded $341,000 (equivalent to $618,770 in 2025) to a former Foot Locker shoe store manager who said the company systematically discriminated against its African American employees by offering more opportunities for promotions to white managers.

== Stores ==
Americas

- United States: 651 (includes U.S. territories)
  - Puerto Rico: 17
  - U.S. Virgin Islands: 2
  - Guam: 1
- Canada: 84

Asia-Pacific

- Australia: 84
- New Zealand: 15
- Israel: 89
- Saudi Arabia: 16
- United Arab Emirates: 10
- Kuwait: 10
- South Korea: 10
- Bahrain: 4
- Oman: 3
- Qatar: 5
- Lebanon: 2
- Jordan: 2
- India: 4
- Indonesia: 51
- Malaysia: 5
- Singapore: 7
- Hong Kong: 6
- Macau: 2
- Philippines: 8
- Vietnam: 1
- Thailand: 5

Europe

- Italy: 179
- France: 146
- Germany: 83
- Spain: 60
- United Kingdom: 59
- Netherlands: 41
- Belgium: 20
- Portugal: 16
- Czech Republic: 10
- Switzerland: 9
- Austria: 8
- Poland: 8
- Ireland: 7
- Denmark: 6
- Hungary: 6
- Luxembourg: 5
- Sweden: 5
- Norway: 5
- Greece: 3
- Romania: 3
