= Warehouse Shoe Sale =

American shoe retailer

WSS, formerly known as Warehouse Shoe Sale, is a national retail chain of shoe stores headquartered in Los Angeles, California, with 92 retail outlets as of January 2020. Its parent company is Foot Locker, which in 2021 bought Eurostar, Inc., the company operating as WSS, for $750 million.

The company now known as WSS traces its roots to 1977 when Eric Alon first sold shoes at a swap meet. The first brick & mortar store opened in 1984 and as of 2018, Alon was still with the company in an executive and ownership role. WSS primarily serves the urban and Latino communities, which has been a large reason for their growth.

In 2015 to celebrate their 30th anniversary, they opened a new flagship in Downtown LA.
