= Edgeworth price cycle =

Financial market model

An Edgeworth price cycle is cyclical pattern in prices characterized by an initial jump, which is then followed by a slower decline back towards the initial level. The term was introduced by Maskin and Tirole (1988) in a theoretical setting featuring two firms bidding sequentially and where the winner captures the full market.

== Phases of a price cycle ==
A price cycle has the following phases:

- War of attrition: When the price is at marginal cost, the firms are engaged in a war of attrition where each firm hopes that the competitor will raise her price first ("relent").
- Jump: When one firm relents, the other firm will then in the next period undercut, which is when the market price jumps. This first period is the most valuable to be the low-price firm, which is what causes firms to want to stay in the war of attrition to force the competitor to jump first.
- Undercutting: then follows a sequence where the firms take turns at undercutting each other until the market arrives back in the war of attrition at the low price.

== Discussion ==
It can be debated whether Edgeworth Cycles should be thought of as tacit collusion because it is a Markov Perfect equilibrium, but Maskin and Tirole write: "Thus our model can be viewed as a theory of tacit collusion." (p. 592).

Edgeworth cycles have been reported in gasoline markets in many countries. Edelman and Ostrovsky (2007) and Zhang and Feng (2011) also demonstrate such price cycles in the setting of search-engine advertising auctions.

Because the cycles tend to occur frequently, weekly average prices found in government reports will generally mask the cycling. Wang (2012) emphasizes the role of price commitment in facilitating price cycles: without price commitment, the dynamic game becomes one of simultaneous move and here, the cycles are no longer a Markov Perfect equilibrium but rely on, e.g., supergame arguments.

Edgeworth cycles are distinguished from both sticky pricing and cost-based pricing. Sticky prices are typically found in markets with less aggressive price competition, so there are fewer or no cycles. Purely cost-based pricing occurs when retailers mark up from wholesale costs, so costs follow wholesale variations closely.

== Alternative models of price cycles ==
There is a separate literature, which has explored conditions under which price cycles like the ones observed gasoline markets and found that consumer search models can rationalize cycling under various conditions. Here, the intuition is that there is a small subset of consumers that are not informed about prices and therefore will buy from a firm regardless of the price charged. Once prices get low enough, a firm may find it optimal to charge a high price and exploit this small loyal segment rather than trying to win the whole market.

== See also ==
- Sticky pricing
