= Champs Sports =

American sports retail store

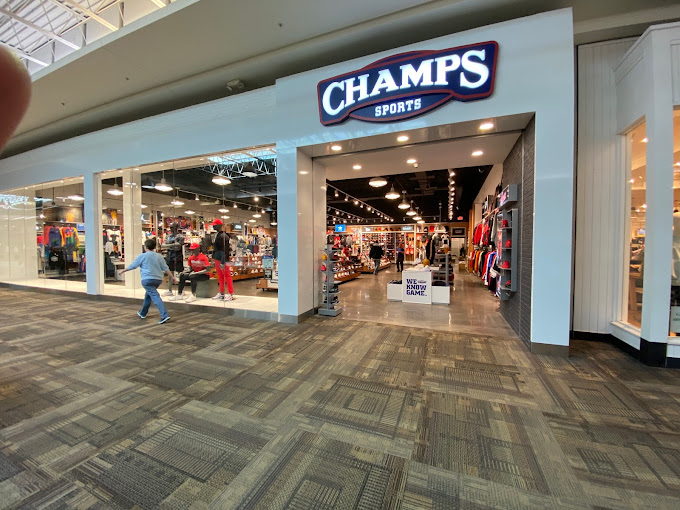
- Champs Sports at the Southern Park Mall
- Type: Subsidiary
- Industry: Retail
- Founded: 1984; 42 years ago
- Founder: Bill Robinson
- Headquarters: Bradenton, Florida, U.S.
- Number of locations: 547 stores (January 2015)
- Area served: United States; Canada; Puerto Rico; United States Virgin Islands
- Key people: Bryon Milburn (CEO)
- Products: Sports apparel, equipment, footwear, and accessories
- Parent: Foot Locker
- Website: champssports.com

Champs Sports is an American sports retail store, operating as a subsidiary of Foot Locker, which itself is a subsidiary of Dick's Sporting Goods. Products sold at Champs Sports include apparel, equipment, footwear, and accessories. As of June 2019, there were 540 store locations found throughout the United States, Canada, Puerto Rico, and the U.S. Virgin Islands. The stores are mainly located in shopping malls, and are 3,500 square feet (330 m^{2}) on average.

== History ==
Logo used until early 2022

=== Early years ===
Champs Sports was acquired in the 1980s by the Woolworth Corporation, then a specialty store division of the F. W. Woolworth Company. It, along with Foot Locker (which was owned by Woolworth and is now the name of the company that succeeded Woolworth), sold athletic merchandise, replacing the five and dime and department store concepts with the increasing specialty store concept.

=== 21st Century ===
In 2000, after a decline in the market of sports apparel, Venator Group shuttered many of their stores, including 27 Champs Sports locations. This proved successful as high-end footwear grew in popularity. In May 2020, a Champs location in Tampa, Florida, was set on fire during the George Floyd protests.

== Marketing ==
=== Swag Magazine ===
With the first issue released on August 28, 2012, Swag Magazine is a quarterly online publication focused on showing sports fans a different side of athletes and celebrities. Champs Sports partnered with many companies, including Under Armour, Adidas, and Nike, giving fans an interesting look on sports. The magazine features athlete interviews, athletic gear, and interactive videos.

=== Nike Yardline ===
On September 8, 2012, Champs Sports and Nike launched Nike Yardline, a store specializing in NFL apparel. The first store opened in the Willowbrook Mall in Wayne, New Jersey. Champs Sports and Nike stated that they are looking to expand the concept in the future.

Between January 5–6, 2013, a Nike Yardline location was also opened in South Beach, Miami Beach, Florida during BCS weekend. The store displayed college football apparel featuring participating bowl teams, including Alabama Crimson Tide and Notre Dame Fighting Irish.

On June 19, 2013, Champs Sports and Nike launched their second mall-based location in the Mall of America in Bloomington, Minnesota. Promoting the grand opening was Minnesota Vikings's running back Adrian Peterson, who signed autographs and released a new shoe style.

=== Sponsorships ===
From 2004 until June 18, 2012, Champs Sports sponsored the Florida Citrus Sports's annual college football bowl game. Each sponsorship is a four-year deal costing them $4.25 million. Vice president of Champs Sports Rob Brodersen commented, "As the premier mall destination for the core sports enthusiast, it is a natural fit for Champs Sports to continue our partnership with FCS. We are excited to strengthen our relationship and look forward to further success by building upon our athletic heritage with this high profile college bowl game." Although the name of the bowl was changed, Champs Sports continued to remain an official partner of both the Russell Athletic Bowl and the Capital One Bowl through 2014.

== Controversies ==
=== Dispute with Nike ===
In late 2002, Nike placed restrictions on stores that sold their products. These restrictions required stores, including Foot Locker and its subsidiaries, to sell less popular lines of merchandise alongside the high-end products. Knowing the sale of these products could negatively impact profits, Foot Locker refused to sell any Nike products unless they received better quality products. Both Nike and Foot Locker suffered from the lack of sales. A negotiated agreement ended the dispute in late 2003, and Nike products were re-admitted to the stores.
