= Kinney Shoes =

Shoe retailer

G. R. Kinney Company
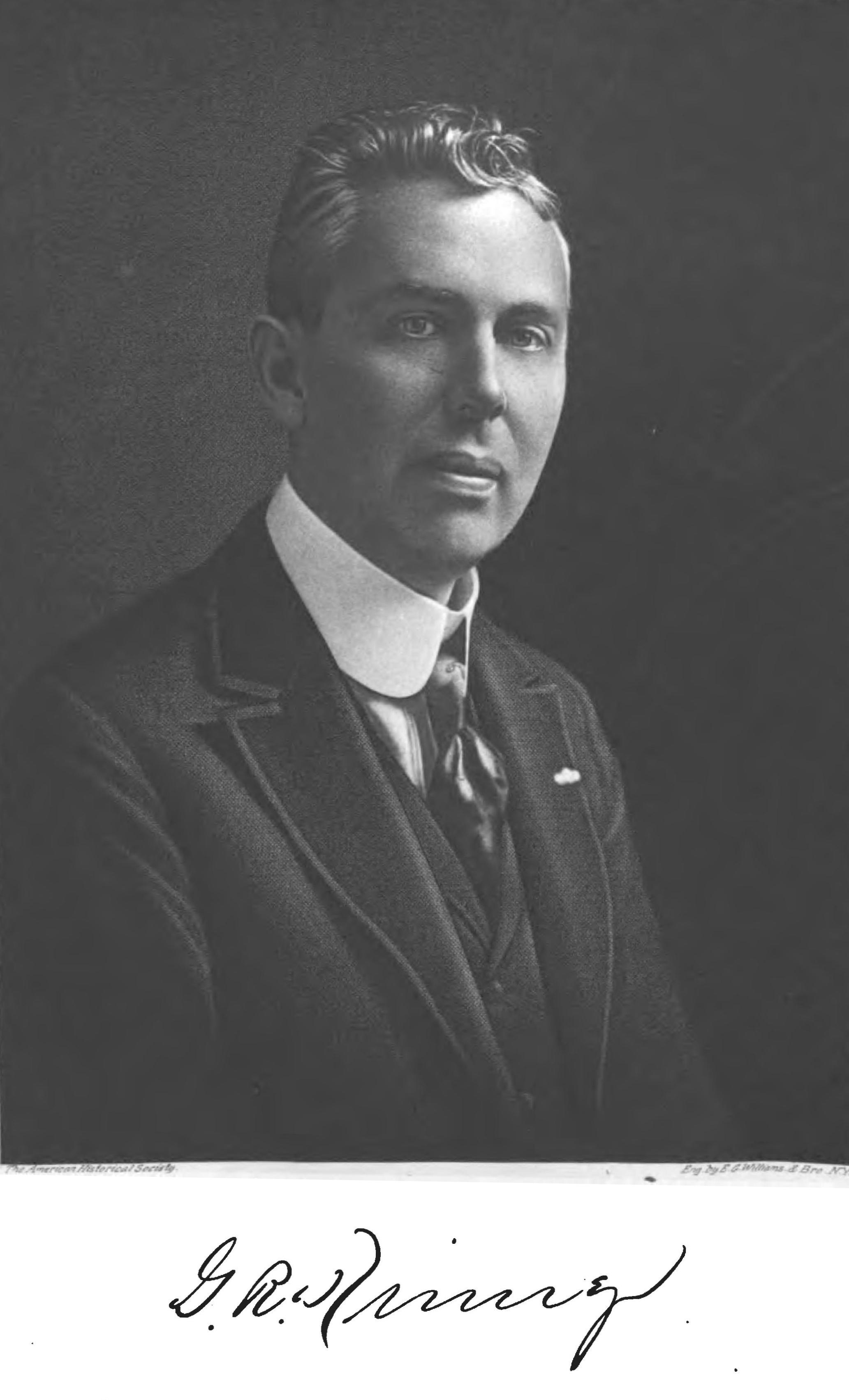
- G. R. Kinney c. 1919
- Founded: 1894; 132 years ago Waverly, NY, U.S.
- Founder: George Romanta Kinney
- Defunct: September 16, 1998; 28 years ago
- Fate: Business reorganization
- Successor: Foot Locker
- Area served: United States, Canada, Puerto Rico

The G. R. Kinney Company was an American manufacturer and retailer of shoes from 1894 until September 16, 1998. It was listed on the New York Stock Exchange in March 1923, with the symbol KNN. The shoe concern was started by George Romanta Kinney whose father ran a general store in rural Candor, New York. The father became indebted and George vowed to repay his debts. In 1894, at the age of 28, he had saved enough to purchase a Lester retail outlet in Waverly, New York. Lester Shoe of Binghamton, New York, was the predecessor to the Endicott Johnson Corporation. Kinney succeeded by selling affordably priced shoes to working Americans.

The business chain numbered 362 stores at the conclusion of 1929, with 44 of these opening in the final year of the decade. Foot Locker began as a division of the Kinney Shoe Corporation in 1974.

== Chain and later a subsidiary ==
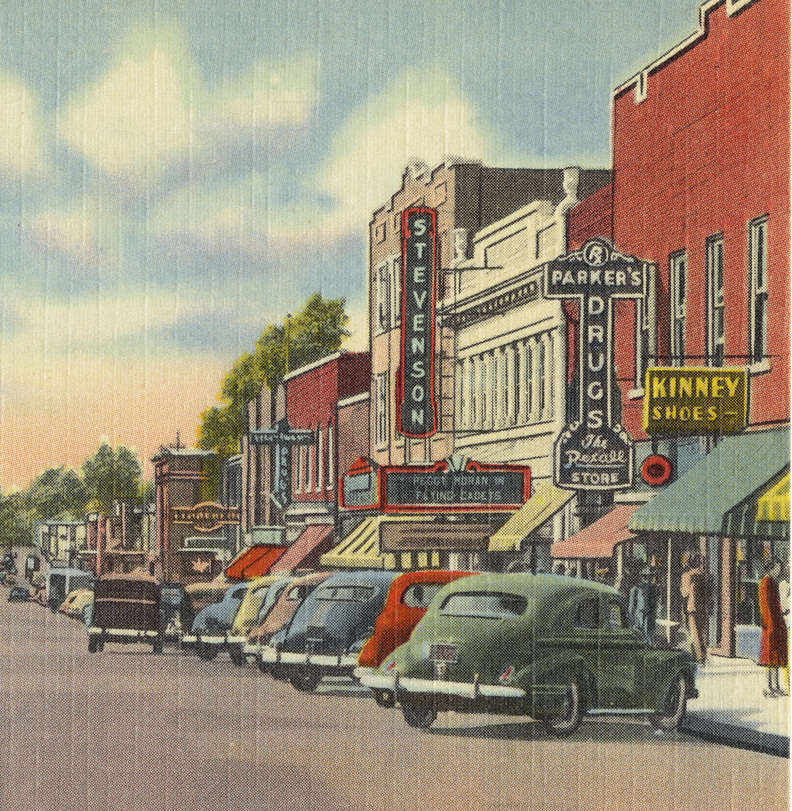
Kinney shoe store in North Carolina, early 1940s.

Kinney Shoes was the largest family chain shoe retailer in the United States at the beginning of 1936, with 335 stores operating nationwide. Although it was selling more shoes at the conclusion of 1936 than in 1929, its dollar volume was 20% to 30% below 1929.

On August 31, 1963, the G. R. Kinney Company was sold to F. W. Woolworth. Prior to this it was a subsidiary of the Brown Shoe Company which sold it for $45 million. The firm was renamed the Kinney Shoe Corporation and continued as a fully owned subsidiary of Woolworth. It retained its own eleven member board of directors and an existing panel of corporate officers.

== Foot Locker exclusivity ==
The company continued operating throughout the 1960s and 1970s with divisions named Stylco (1967), Susie's Casuals (1968), and Foot Locker (1974). On September 16, 1998, the Venator Group, formerly known as Woolworth, announced that Kinney's 467 shoe stores and 103 Footquarters stores would close. Foot Locker is now owned by Dick's Sporting Goods.
