= McCrystal =

McCrystal is a surname. Notable people with the surname include:

- Cal McCrystal (journalist), British journalist
- Eamonn McCrystal (tenor), Northern Irish Singer
- Cal McCrystal (director), British theatre director, son of the above
- Damien McCrystal, British journalist, son of the journalist Cal McCrystal
- Eve McCrystal, Irish cyclist
- Kevin McCrystal, Gaelic football manager

== See also ==
- McChrystal
