= City A.M. =

British business newspaper (founded 2005)

City AM
- Business With Personality

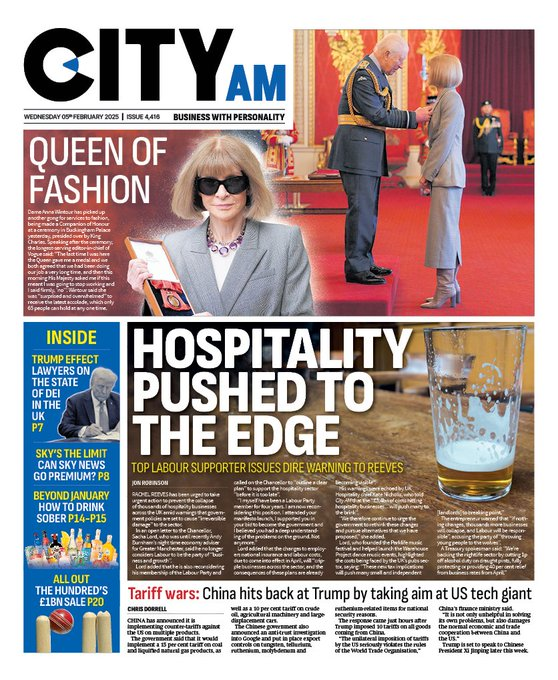
- A City AM front page from February 2025
- Type: Freesheet daily newspaper
- Format: Tabloid
- Owner: THG Ingenuity
- Founders: Lawson Muncaster; Jens Torpe
- Editor-in-chief: Christian May
- Founded: September 2005; 21 years ago
- Headquarters: Northern and Shell Building, 10 Lower Thames St, London EV3R 6EN
- City: London
- Country: United Kingdom
- Circulation: 68422 (as of January 2026)
- ISSN: 2516-5445 (print); 2516-5453 (web)
- Website: cityam.com

City A.M. (stylized City AM on some of its products) is a UK business and finance media organisation that publishes across CityAM.com, the City AM App and a free, London-wide print edition three days a week.

It also produces a quarterly lifestyle magazine and produces video and audio content from its City AM Studio. Its editorial output focuses on markets, business, finance, economics and politics.

As of January 2026, it had a print circulation of 68,422.

== History ==
City AM was launched in September 2005. Its launch editor was former Sunday Times and Sunday Express journalist David Parsley. He was succeeded by Allister Heath, who joined in February 2008 and was editor for six years. He was previously the editor of The Business, a weekly magazine which closed in February 2008. David Hellier, formerly of The Independent and the Daily and Sunday Express, replaced Heath and served until 2015 when he was replaced by Christian May. Andy Silvester replaced May in November 2020, relaunching the newspaper and website after the Covid-19 pandemic.

Christian May returned as the Editor-in-Chief in the summer of 2024.

== Content ==
The news section is primarily made up of business, financial and economic stories, as well as political and regulatory stories.

In recent years, the newspaper has expanded its coverage beyond purely financial stories to include broader reporting on the business environment, and has increased its coverage of tech, fintech and hospitality businesses in particular.

The newspaper includes a debate column in the comments section, which involves politicians with an opposite view on a subject, such as on Brexit or economic reform, give short answers explaining their case.

Alongside the newspaper, other initiatives include City A.M. Magazine, a quarterly lifestyle magazine for City professionals.

== Events ==
City AM also hosts City AM Awards, an annual event that celebrates the outstanding achievements of firms and individuals across the Square Mile, the City AM Awards have been held for 20 years.

Key categories include:

- Business of the Year
- Bank of the Year
- Entrepreneur of the Year
- City Champion
- Innovative Company
- Investor of the Year

Significant recent winners and finalists include:

- Law Firm of the Year (2025): Freeths, recognized for their work on the Post Office Horizon scandal litigation and consistent double-digit growth.
- Insurance Company of the Year (2025): Howden

City AM also hosts the Toast Awards, toasting hospitality in the City of London and the Dragon Awards, an ESG annual event.

== Ownership ==
City AM Ltd was sold to THG plc by The Blue Bull Limited, NashCo Ltd and co-founders Lawson Muncaster and Jens Torpe in July 2023. In January 2025, THG plc demerged its technology and logistics arm, THG Ingenuity, into a privately owned, stand-alone business.

== Distribution ==
The newspaper is published in print Tuesday to Thursday with a "digital edition" on Mondays and Fridays, and is distributed at more than 400 commuter hubs across London and the Home Counties, as well as over 500 offices throughout the City, Canary Wharf and other areas of high business concentration, with an average daily circulation of 68,422 copies as of January 2026.

== Website ==
The newspaper announced a major digital expansion in March 2014 and appointed Metro's head of digital content Martin Ashplant to be its digital and social media director. Chief executive Jens Torpe said at the time that he expected the website audience to grow to be bigger than the printed version. In October 2014, City AM reported that it had seen its website traffic grow almost three-fold in a year. In 2015, cityam.com became the first UK newspaper website to prevent users with ad blockers switched on from reading content.

== Editors ==
Editors
Years	Editor
2005–2008	David Parsley
2008–2014	Allister Heath
2014–2015	David Hellier
2015–2020	Christian May
2020–2024	Andy Silvester
2024–present	Christian May
