= Petra Massey =

British actress (born 1966)

Petra Massey (born, 1966 in England) is a British actress, and a physical theatre performer in stage, film and television. Petra is best known for playing the "enhanced human" Sandstrom in the BBC2 sci-fi comedy series Hyperdrive from 2006 to 2007, and as one of the four members of the international comedy and physical theatre company Spymonkey.

She studied a BA (Hons) in Performing Arts at Middlesex University, and trained with Philippe Gaulier and John Wright in London.

She performed for three years at the New York-New York Hotel & Casino Las Vegas with Spymonkey in Cirque Du Soleil's erotic cabaret Zumanity.
