= Sunday Business =

British newspaper

Sunday Business first edition

Sunday Business was a national Sunday broadsheet financial newspaper published in the United Kingdom, which ran from 1996 to 2006, when it was turned into a magazine called The Business.

== History ==
The newspaper was founded by Tom Rubython in order to provide a Sunday alternative to the Financial Times, achieving sales of around 150,000 on launch, falling to fewer than 20,000 within months. In 1997 the title was bought by the Barclay Brothers, David and Frederick Barclay, who at the time owned The European newspaper and subsequently, The Daily Telegraph and The Scotsman.

It was re-launched on 15 February 1998 with an exclusive interview with Gordon Brown, who promised a budget tailored towards the business community. The Sunday Business became a critical success and within its first two years of production had won numerous industry awards, including Newspaper of The Year (1999) and Newspaper Design of the Year (1998, 2000).

The newspaper became known as a launchpad for the successful careers of the small team put together by editor Jeff Randall in the winter of 1997/8. The newspaper made various moves, both in editorial style and physical location. The newspaper was originally based in Cavendish Square in Central London, while the re-launched newspaper was based in the offices of ITN News in Gray's Inn Road, moving on to South Quay in London Docklands in 2000 and then finally back to the City at Waterhouse Square.

By the summer of 2003, most of the re-launch team had been head-hunted by rival national newspapers, and production of the newspaper was handed over to the Press Association. From its offices in London's Victoria, and under the editorship of Andrew Neil, it was rebranded The Business – a weekly glossy magazine – in the autumn of 2006.

That magazine disappeared in 2008 as it was merged into The Spectator and subsequently re-emerged as the monthly Spectator Business magazine.

== Key people ==
Personnel at the relaunched title included:

- Andrew Neil (publisher): Became presenter of the BBC weekly political roundup show, This Week, and co-presenter of The Daily Politics in 2003. In November 2004 became Chief Executive of The Spectator.
- Jeff Randall (editor): Left in 2001 to become Business Editor of the BBC, and from 2005 editor-at-large of The Daily Telegraph.
- David Cracknell (political editor): Joined from The Press Association, where he was Political Correspondent. Left to join the Sunday Telegraph as Deputy Political Editor in 1999, and then became Political Editor of The Sunday Times in 2001.
- Damien McCrystal (diarist and restaurant reviewer): Joined The Observer as business columnist in 2002, followed by London's Evening Standard as City Diarist. Now runs his own communications consultancy.
- Lucinda Rogers (illustrator): Joined in 1997 and drew weekly for Sunday Business until 2001, along with other broadsheets. Every Saturday she drew to order, either drawing portraits of politicians and other figures, or a long series of drawings of restaurants and chefs to accompany Damien McCrystal's reviews and features.
- Mark Watts (chief investigative reporter): Was sacked in 2001 after protesting against the break-up of the paper's investigative team. Currently a freelance journalist and television host.
- Julian Bovis (art director): Joined The Daily Telegraph as Executive Design Editor (News) in 2003.

== Editors ==
- 1996: Tom Rubython, Anil Bhoyrul, Adrian Lithgow
- 1998: Jeff Randall
- 2001: Nils Pratley
- 2001: Richard Northedge and Iain Watson
