= Trevor Woodison =

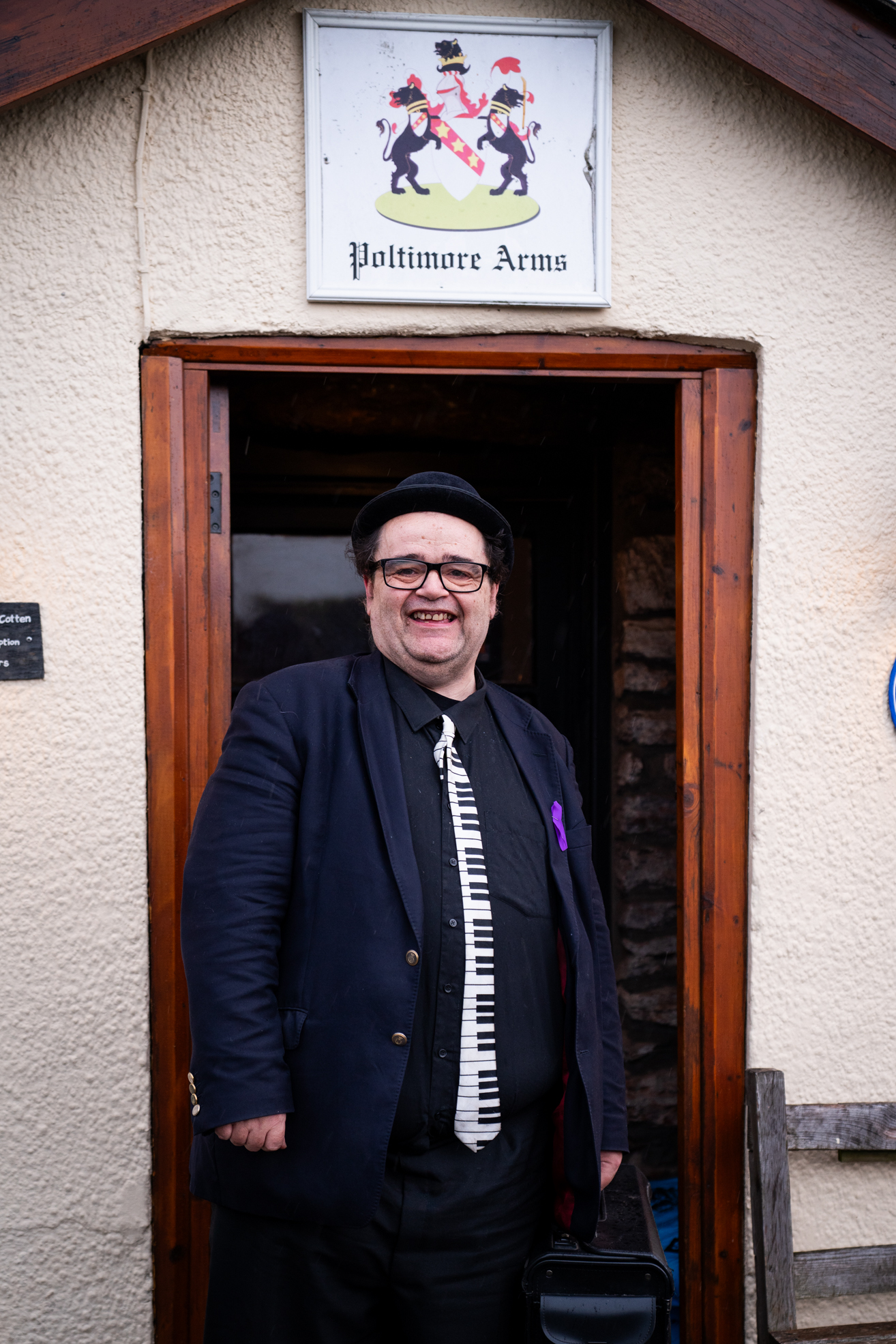

Background information
- Also known as: Trev The Pianoman
- Born: 7 October 1964 (age 62); Stratford, Newham
- Occupations: Musician, composer, entertainer
- Instruments: Piano, violin
- Years active: 1979–present
- Website: trevthepianoman.co.uk

Trev Woodison (born 7 October 1964 in Stratford East London), also known as "Trev the Pianoman", is a British pianist, musician, and entertainer who regularly performs, preserves and promotes pub piano throughout the United Kingdom.

== Early life ==
A lot of Woodison's initial interest in music was generated by his grandfather who introduced him to an old wind up gramophone and a sideboard full of old 78rpm records at 6 years old. A discovery of those sounds helped him to develop an early love of music. In particular the sounds of the artist Winifred Atwell who gave him a love of the sound of the piano.

Through the joy of listening to Winnie's recordings inspired him to commence music lessons when they were offered to him at a young age, in particular on the piano and violin. The lessons were offered at Newham Academy of Music whilst at primary school. Woodison started experimenting and composing his first pieces of music at the age of 11. Once becoming a teenager, a lot of his musical training continued to be received at the Newham Academy of Music in East Ham.

At the age of 15 he was then approached by one of his neighbours, a pub pianist named Dick Brodie who was well known in the pub piano scene in London. In return for Trev teaching his daughter Nicola Barratt, Brodie became Woodison's mentor and guided him, helping establish Woodison as a pub player in his own right.

From playing the intervals at some of Brodie's gigs in Plaistow and Canning Town, Woodison eventually started playing his own evenings in places that Brodie couldn't manage when being double booked.

Since the first day of an entire gig of his own in 1979, Woodison has never looked back, continuing to play in and around the East End before going to music college in 1984 at Colchester Institute to sit a BA Hons in music specializing in piano and composition.

== Career ==
After graduating in 1987 he made a move to the Westcountry settling in Devon where he set up a teaching practice as well as performing as a freelance artist. Throughout the 1990s and the 2000s Woodison's main priority was teaching where he taught a number of students the piano and violin. He also wrote a number of pieces for Hatherleigh Silver, and Great Torrington Silver Brass Bands which were performed in a number of local concerts in North Devon.

A number of chamber orchestra pieces have also been written as well as a range of concertos that are all written for a soloist accompanied by a string orchestra. Concertos of note are the bassoon concerto written in 2000, his oboe concerto written in 2008 and more recently a piano concerto written in 2022. His composition style is influenced by the local folk scene of Devon and Cornwall as well as composers such as Ronald Binge, Eric Coates and Vivian Ellis.

After Brodie's death in 2014, Woodison gradually reduced his teaching work and focused again on pub piano.

== Present day ==
Before jukeboxes, karaoke, and disc jockeys the main form of pub entertainment was pub piano where patrons would sing along to a pianists playing thousands of different tunes. Pub piano hit its peak at post war but rapidly declined near the end of the 20th century, coming from the thousands of players in the 1960s to only dozens in the 2000s. Woodison is one of that small number of players left in the United Kingdom performing the pub tradition. Knowing that he is one of the last surviving pub pianists in the UK, he decided to try rescuing the art form.

Following Brodie's death in 2014, Woodison made an effort to expand his repertoire and look for more pianos in pubs. In 2016 he encountered Harry Crompton who happened to be friends with his son and daughter was enthusiastic about Woodison's work, Crompton wanted to help Trev find pianos and so he did.

=== BBC Spotlight ===
In 2019, after finding more pianos and getting more successful bookings since Harry's intervention, Crompton decided to write an article to local news television BBC Spotlight about Woodison, and the quest to save pub piano. Following some editing by Woodison the story was sent to Plymouth where their local news channel is broadcast.

There was some success with the story. Woodison ended up on the TV show which lead to further bookings and a call in show on BBC Radio Devon

This growing success was stopped in its tracks almost overnight when the United Kingdom along with most of the world were put into lockdown due to COVID-19. All of Woodison's performances were stopped and so from that he chose to focus on expanding his repertoire of around 3,000 pieces being eventually augmented to a new size of around 4,200.

=== Local newspapers ===
After years of hard work, in 2025 Woodison and Crompton successfully revived the pub piano once again leading to a renewed level of bookings. However numbers were still significantly lower than the heights achieved in late 2019 and early 2020.

Encouraged by this momentum, Crompton decided again to attempt a reconnection with the media, somewhat reminiscent of their past success with a BBC article six years earlier. This time, their story caught the attention of not just the Express & Echo, but also the Exmouth Journal and Exeter Today, each producing their own pieces about Woodison's and Crompton's quest.

=== National newspapers ===
In the same year of the Express and Echo story, a news agency named South West News Service that tries to expand local story's to higher tabloids came forward. A photographer from the business, Will Dax, had ambitions to take the story to national level. He took photos and recordings at an arranged pub in North Devon then sent the content back to the agency. Weeks later the revival of pub piano hit Daily Express, The i Paper, The Mirror, Western Morning News, The Sun, and a promotional video was created.

=== BBC Radio 4 ===
Presumably because of the national newspapers, Woodison received an invitation as a guest on BBC Radio 4. He had an interview fixed up by phone which later went out on PM in which he answered questions from the presenter Evan Davis.

=== International presence ===
Weeks after the BBC Radio 4 interview, ZDF, a German Broadcaster, took on Woodison's and Crompton's unique story. It reached many German-speaking countries. An interview was arranged with one of their mobile film crews where they interviewed Woodison's in The Bootlegers Bar in Exeter. Trev faced a barrage of questions, played a lot more pieces and went into more depth about the pub piano than any other organisation had ever asked for.

=== BBC Radio 2 ===
Not long after the ZDF interview, Woodison was on BBC Radio 2 as a guest with Jeremy Vine, one of the key presenters of UK radio. During the show Woodison did a call out session, and expressed his concern about pub piano.
