= Patience Wheatcroft, Baroness Wheatcroft =

British journalist and life peeress

The Right Honourable The Baroness Wheatcroft
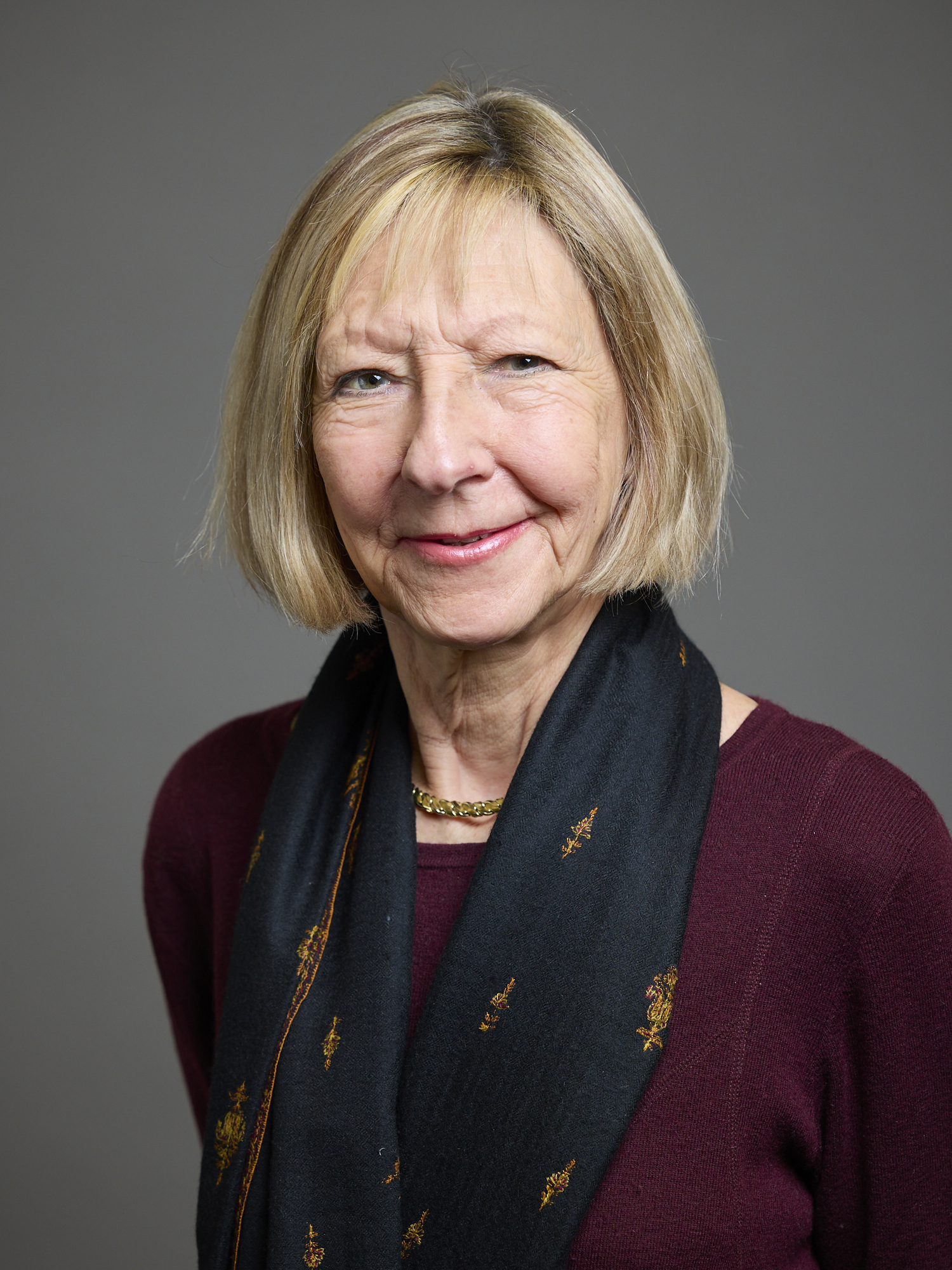
- Official portrait, 2024

Member of the House of Lords
- Lord Temporal
- Life peerage 22 December 2010

Personal details
- Born: 28 September 1951 (age 75) Chesterfield, Derbyshire, England
- Party: Non-affiliated (previously Conservative)
- Education: University of Birmingham

Patience Jane Wheatcroft, Baroness Wheatcroft (born 28 September 1951) is a British journalist and life peeress, who was editor-in-chief of The Wall Street Journal Europe. She left this role upon becoming a peer.

She previously served as editor of The Sunday Telegraph newspaper. She resigned from this post in September 2007 after eighteen months in the job and temporarily moved out of journalism.

== Career ==
Wheatcroft was educated at Wolverhampton Girls' High School and Birmingham University (LLB, Law, 1972). She and her husband, Tony Salter, launched the specialist trade magazine Retail Week in 1988 and Wheatcroft served as its consultant editor until 1992.

She has worked on several national newspapers, including the Daily Mail, The Sunday Times and The Daily Telegraph. After serving as Deputy City Editor of The Mail on Sunday, she was appointed Business and City Editor of The Times in 1997 and then as editor of The Sunday Telegraph in March 2006.

Wheatcroft won the Wincott Senior Journalist of the Year Award in 2001 and in 2003 was London Press Club Business Journalist of the Year.

She resigned as editor of The Sunday Telegraph on 4 September 2007, being replaced by Ian MacGregor, who until then had been deputy editor of The Daily Telegraph. Reports stated that Wheatcroft was under pressure to integrate the Sunday paper's reporters with the daily newspaper's 24/7 operation.

== Appointments ==
From 1 January 2008 until 2009, Wheatcroft served as a non-executive director of Barclays plc.

From 27 February 2008 until 2009, she served as a non-executive director of Shaftesbury plc, a British property investment company with assets in central London.

On 8 May 2008, she was appointed head of the newly created Forensic Audit Panel by the incoming Mayor of London, Boris Johnson. The panel is tasked with monitoring and investigating financial management at the London Development Agency and the Greater London Authority.

On 30 July 2010, Prime Minister David Cameron appointed Wheatcroft to the board of the British Museum.

On 22 December 2010, Wheatcroft was created a life peer as Baroness Wheatcroft, of Blackheath in the London Borough of Greenwich. She sat in the House of Lords as a Conservative peer, having been a long-standing supporter of the party, until November 2019, but now sits as an unaffiliated peer.

On 4 April 2012, she became a non-executive board member of Fiat S.p.A. From 12 October 2014 until Stellantis-group's creation on 16 January 2021, she was a non-executive board member of Fiat Chrysler Automobiles.

In early 2023, she ran to be Chairlady of the European Movement, losing to Mike Galsworthy.

== Personal life ==
Wheatcroft is married with three children. Her publisher husband Tony was a Conservative Party campaigner working in the London boroughs of Greenwich and Lewisham.

== Arms ==
Coat of arms of Patience Wheatcroft, Baroness Wheatcroft

Escutcheon
Azure on a chevron between three garbs Or three larks Sable singing and each supporting a quill pen Azure.
Supporters
Dexter a female rat sinister a male Siamese cat both Azure.
Motto
Patience And Perseverance

Media offices
Preceded by Sarah Sands	Editor of The Sunday Telegraph; 2006–2007	Succeeded by Ian MacGregor
