= Jeff Randall =

Jeff Randall may refer to:

- Jeff Randall (journalist), (born 1954), British journalist
- Jeff Randall, a fictional detective played by Mike Pratt in the late 1960s TV series Randall and Hopkirk (Deceased)
