= Ian MacGregor (journalist) =

British newspaper editor

Ian MacGregor is a British journalist. He is a former editor of The Sunday Telegraph, now in an 'Emeritus' role.

== Early life ==
MacGregor studied at the University of Edinburgh, where he edited the student newspaper, titled The Student.

== Career ==
MacGregor entered professional journalism in 1986 at the Southern Evening Echo in Southampton, along with Tony Gallagher, later editor of The Daily Telegraph and The Sun. MacGregor joined South West News Service in Bristol in 1988. He was then the editor of Metro during 2001, and moved to become Deputy Editor of the Evening Standard at the start of 2002. In 2006, he was appointed Deputy Editor of The Daily Telegraph; the post was initially intended to be held jointly with Will Lewis, but Lewis was then appointed as the paper's editor.

In September 2007, MacGregor was promoted to become Editor of The Sunday Telegraph. He moved to an "Editor Emeritus" post in April 2017, and was replaced as editor by Allister Heath. His new role is intended to be as a coordinator between the commercial and editorial sides of the operation

In April 2018, MacGregor was appointed to the board of the Independent Press Standards Organisation (IPSO) as an industry member.

Media offices
Preceded by New position	Editor of Metro; 1999–2001	Succeeded by Kenny Campbell
Preceded by Peter Bowyer?	Deputy Editor of the Evening Standard; 2002–2006	Succeeded by Andrew Bordiss
Preceded by Neil Darbyshire and Will Lewis	Deputy Editor of The Daily Telegraph; 2006–2007	Succeeded by Tony Gallagher
Preceded by Patience Wheatcroft	Editor of The Sunday Telegraph; 2007–2017	Succeeded by Allister Heath
