= Barry McIlheney =

Northern Ireland journalist (1960–2025)

- Born: 13 May 1958
- Died: 25 May 2025 (aged 67)
- Occupation: Journalist • Editor • Publisher

Barry McIlheney (13 May 1958 – 25 May 2025) was a British journalist, editor, broadcaster and publisher. He died in Granada Province, Spain.

== Early life ==
Born in a working-class area of north Belfast, Northern Ireland, McIlheney went on to graduate from Trinity College, Dublin, and London's City University. Before becoming a journalist in London, he worked in Belfast as a hospital porter, steel worker and librarian.

== Career ==
After a brief spell in local newspapers and at Melody Maker magazine, McIlheney was appointed editor of Smash Hits in 1986, seeing its circulation double to 800,000 during his time in the job. From there he moved on to become editor of Empire magazine, which was launched in May 1989. He was the managing editor of the UK version of Premiere magazine when it was launched in September 1992.

In 1994, McIlheney became managing director of EMAP Metro, publishers of Empire and Smash Hits, as well as other titles such as Q and Mojo, and just after they had acquired FHM. In 1999 he launched Heat and a year later became chief executive of EMAP Elan, publishers of Elle, Red, and The Face. In 2003, McIlheney moved into new product development, overseeing the launch of Zoo both in the UK and Australia.

At the end of 2006, McIlheney moved to a consultancy role, working on new titles at EMAP. In January 2008 he became editor-in-chief at Sport Media Group, responsible for a £1 million relaunch in April 2008 of their newspaper titles, the Daily Sport and Sunday Sport. In 2009 he launched media consultancy mcilheneybovis with newspaper art director Julian Bovis and wrote for publications including The Word magazine.

McIlheney was Chief Executive of the Professional Publishers Association (PPA).

== Awards ==
McIlheney won multiple industry awards, including being named PPA Editor of the Year in 1993 (as Editor of Empire) and being recognised by Magazines Ireland with a Lifetime Achievement award in 2018. In 2025, McIlheney was posthumously honoured by the British Society of Magazine Editors with the prestigious Mark Boxer Award, which recognises outstanding commitment to magazine journalism across an entire career.

== Personal life ==
McIlheney was married to the journalist and psychotherapist Lola Borg and they had two children, Frankie and Mary.
