= Retail Week =

British trade magazine

Retail Week is a London-based news website, data service, events producer and previously a magazine covering the retail industry, primarily in the United Kingdom.

== History and profile ==
Founded in 1988 by financial journalist Patience Wheatcroft and her husband Tony Salter, Retail Week is now owned by the business information and events company William Reed.

Subscribers are primarily retail company board directors and senior managers, as well as suppliers to retailers and investment analysts.

Retail Week launched its website, Retail-week.com, in 2004. The site was redesigned and relaunched in 2007 and most recently in 2021. Retail-week.com has 192,000 monthly users.

Charlotte Hardie has been editor-in-chief of Retail Week since January 2023. The previous editors were Patience Wheatcroft (1988–1992), Ian McGarrigle (1992–1996), Kate Oppenheim (1996–1999), Neill Denny (1999–2004), Tim Danaher, (2005–2011) Chris Brook-Carter (2012–2020) and Luke Tugy (2020–2022).

Retail Week runs an annual conference in London called LIVE with The Grocer for leaders of the retail and FMCG industries and hosts the annual Retail Week Awards.
