= The Business (magazine) =

Business newspaper in London

- Editor: Allister Heath
- Categories: News magazine
- Frequency: Weekly
- Founded: 2006
- Final issue: 2008
- Company: Press Holdings
- Country: United Kingdom
- Based in: London

The Business was a business magazine published in the United Kingdom between 2006 and 2008.

Tom Rubython founded the Sunday Business newspaper in 1996, which provided a Sunday alternative to the Financial Times. In the autumn of 2006, after the paper experienced financial difficulties, the Barclay brothers (owners of The Daily Telegraph) acquired the title, repackaged it under the guidance of Andrew Neil, and converted to a magazine.

From 2007 to 2008 the magazine was edited by Allister Heath, who had held a number of roles at the publication since 2002. On 13 February 2008, shortly after Heath's departure, it was announced that The Business magazine would be closing, to be replaced by The Spectator Business. Its paid circulation had been very small and it had relied on numbers of free copies to increase its reach.
