= Jeff Randall Live =

Former television business news programme, broadcast on Sky News

- Jeff Randall Live titles
- Presented by: Jeff Randall
- Country of origin: United Kingdom
- No. of episodes: 1000

Production
- Production location: 30 St Mary Axe
- Running time: 30 minutes (September 2007 – September 2010); 60 minutes (September 2010 – March 2014)
- Production company: Sky News

Original release
- Network: Sky News
- Release: 24 September 2007 – 27 March 2014

Related
- Ian King Live

Jeff Randall Live is a business programme broadcast on Sky News in the United Kingdom at 19:00 from Monday to Thursday. It began on 24 September 2007 as a weekly show, and was hosted by the business journalist Jeff Randall. The show featured interviews with some of the UK's leading business, financial and political figures, with guests including the billionaire tycoon Philip Green, and former Chancellor Alistair Darling.

In January 2009, Jeff Randall joined Sky News on a permanent basis with the programme becoming part of the daily schedule instead of its previous weekly status when it only aired on a Monday.

In September 2010, Jeff Randall Live was extended to a one-hour slot Monday-Thursday, this followed the axing of SkyNews.com, which until then aired in the previous 30-minute slot.

It was announced in July 2013 that the show would end in Summer 2014, after Randall decided not to renew his contract with BSkyB, but it was later announced that Randall would present his last show on Thursday 27 March 2014.

== Move to the City ==
At the end of February 2010, Jeff Randall Live moved to a new studio in the City of London at 30 St Mary Axe, better known as "The Gherkin". Special programmes like the budget and other business related programmes were also broadcast from this studio.

== Boulton and Randall Unleashed ==
Following the announcement of the 2010 general election, Jeff Randall Live was incorporated into an hour-long show – Boulton & Randall Unleashed. The show aired weekdays from 19:00 to 20:00, with Adam Boulton in Westminster and Jeff Randall in the city and summarised the daily election news and reaction. The programme ran for the duration of the election campaign.
