= Ian King (journalist) =

British business journalist

- Education: University of Manchester; City, University of London
- Occupation: Journalist
- Employer: Sky News
- Notable work: Business Live

Ian King is a British business journalist who presented Business Live, the daily business programme on Sky News.

== Early life and career ==
King was brought up in Bristol and Devon. He has a degree in history from the University of Manchester (where he edited the students' union newspaper The Mancunion) and a postgraduate diploma in newspaper journalism from City, University of London. Before entering his journalism career, he spent three and a half years working for Midland Bank in the City of London, and then as a business analyst at HSBC.

== Career ==
King worked at The Daily Telegraph, The Guardian and The Mail on Sunday, before joining The Sun as their business editor in 2000, a position he held for eight years. He became deputy business editor of The Times in 2008 and business and city editor in 2011. He occasionally appeared alongside Jeff Randall on Jeff Randall Live. He succeeded Randall as the face of Sky News's business coverage at the end of March 2014. Head of Sky News John Ryley said: "Ian's credentials are impeccable. He is a powerhouse in business journalism and I know he will make a real impact with our viewers."

He presented Ian King Live, Sky News' weekday business programme, live from CNBC Europe's studios at 10 Fleet Place. The programme was later titled Business Live with Ian King and then simply Business Live. On 6 December 2024, it was announced that King was to leave Sky News in the spring. King had been off air since September, when Business Live moved to the main Sky studios in Osterley, West London.

King contributes occasional business columns to The Times.

== Controversy ==
In August 2015, Ofcom investigated King after he used the word "fuck" on live television before the 9 pm watershed. King's accidental swear came during an Ian King Live interview with an economist about interest rates in the United States.

== Awards ==
King has been a business journalist on national newspapers and television for nearly 25 years, and has won the Business Journalist of the Year award twice. The motivational speakers bureau Raise the Bar has described him as a "well-seasoned journalist".
