= Spymonkey =

Comedy and physical theatre company

Spymonkey is an international comedy and physical theatre company, based in Brighton. Its members are Toby Park and Petra Massey, both British, Aitor Basauri, a Spaniard, and Stephan Kreiss (1962–2021), a German. According to the theatre director, Tom Morris, ‘Spymonkey follow a rich comic tradition which runs from Tommy Cooper through Morecambe and Wise to Reeves and Mortimer. They are clowns supreme, the high priests of foolery.' For Julian Crouch of Improbable Theatre, they are ‘groundbreaking and sharply brilliant, Spymonkey dance along the very boundary of artistic bravery. They take big risks in their work, and manage to be both true to a highly experimental process AND take their audience with them on that journey.'

== Beginnings ==
Park, Massey and Basauri met in 1997, when they were working with the Swiss action-theatre group Karl's Kühne Gassenschau in Zurich. The following year, in Brighton, they created their first show Stiff with Paul Weilenmann (their former boss at KKG), the director Cal McCrystal and the designer Lucy Bradridge. When Wielenmann left, Spymonkey advertised for a 'funny German' to replace him and, in 2000, found Stephan Kreiss. McCrystal later recalled, 'We made him do Hitler impressions to see if he had a sense of humour. And he did them really, really well.'

Park, Massey, Basauri, Kreiss and McCrystal all trained with the French master clown Philippe Gaulier. Spymonkey's first shows were co-created with McCrystal, who helped shape their stage personas. In a 2013 interview, Park said, "He really put the company together in terms of defining how the four of us work together on stage, the status relationships and comedic interplay between the four of us, what we would term our clowns....They are basically bits of the four of us which have been through the Cal McCrystallographier and exploded, warped and expanded into oversized cartoon-like dimensions. But they are all rooted in a bit of truth. I am and remain slightly pretentious and pompous in my artistic ambitions, but I look good in a suit. Stephan really doesn't give an arse whether he's pissing us off or not, he remains an anarchist, very unpredictable. Aitor would always like to be considered a great serious theatre actor rather than a very funny Spaniard, and will be very upset if you laugh at him when he is being serious."

== Stiff ==
Spymonkey's first play, Stiff, a comedy set in a funeral parlour, was first performed in 1998. Toby Park is Forbes Murdston, a pompous tragedian. After the death of his wife, Murdston has written a sentimental melodrama to express his grief, but he has made the mistake of hiring an enthusiastic, but incompetent, troupe of actors to perform in it. Stephan Kreiss is Mr Keller, the officious Teutonic embalmer, obsessed with organ donor cards. Aitor Basauri is Alfredo Graves, the overzealous Spanish pall-bearer. Petra Massey is Mandy Bandy, the dementedly romantic receptionist and make-up artiste. Murdston's attempts to stage his play are continually undermined by the three, and his frustration rises, to great comic effect, throughout the show.

In his Rose Bruford dissertation, Mathew Baynton looked at one scene in order to describe the 'multi-layered dynamic' of Spymonkey's work:

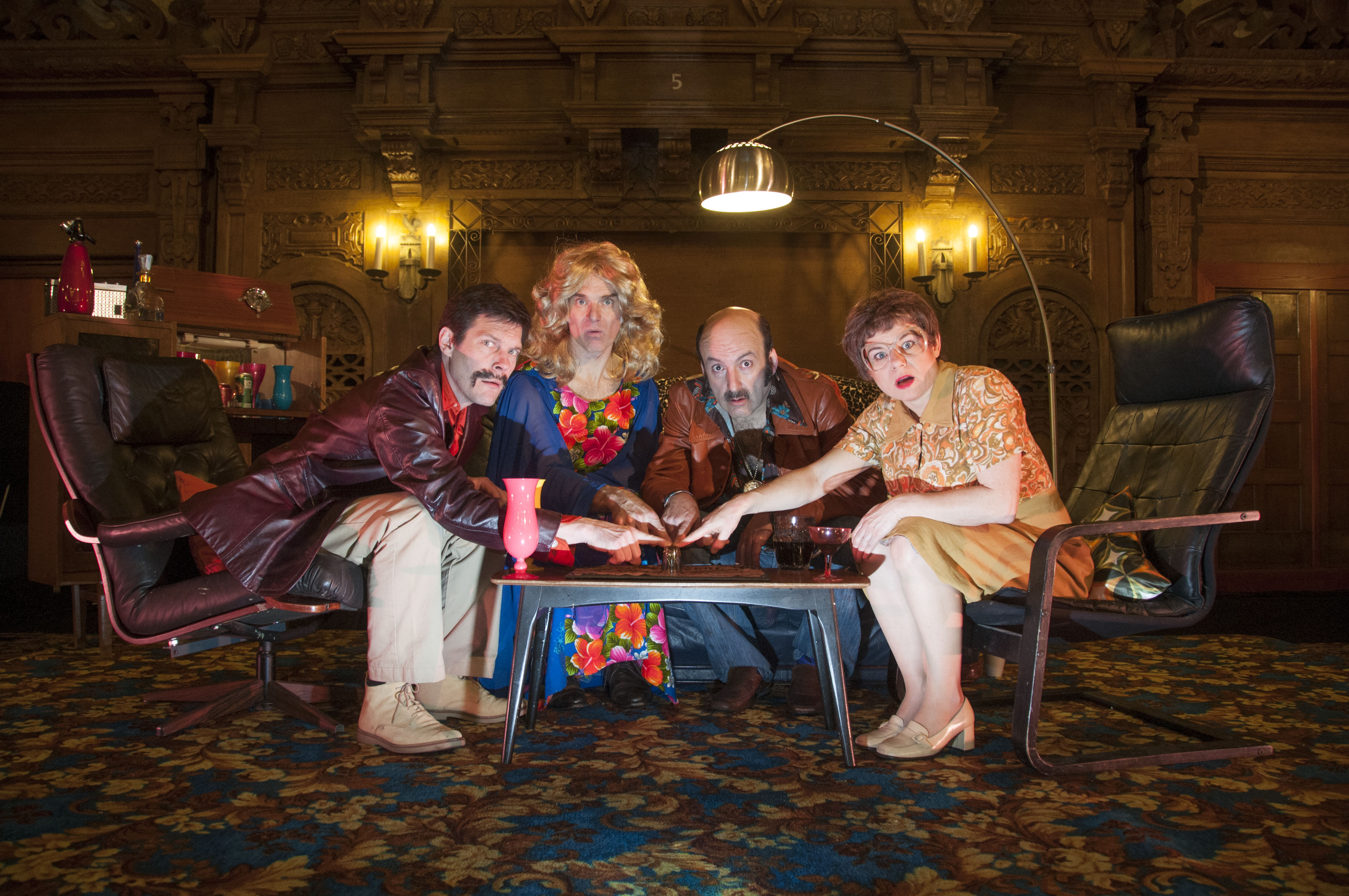
Promotional imagery for the comedy and physical theatre company Spymonkey

"Forbes has come to discuss the funeral arrangements for his late wife. Perhaps this is why Petra's clown, Amanda Bandy, has decided she can improve the show by playing a love scene – she thinks, "the audience don't want to be depressed by a scene about funeral arrangements, they want a classic love story!" or perhaps she is simply out to impress any agents in the audience, using each scene to show off another side of her versatile acting range....Forbes tries to cut in at first but soon loses his patience...and eventually resigns to her whim, taking the ring she thrusts at him and leaving. The whole scene had been a spontaneous choice for Mandy Bandy, and a complete surprise to Forbes. Here we have the multi-layered dynamic of a Spymonkey show – The actors are playing clowns who are playing characters."

Reviewing the play in The Times in 2001, Donald Hutera wrote, 'The smartly silly inventions of a superbly skilful cast levitated me into a state of snickering convulsing and literally teary-eyed happiness.'

The set, props and costumes were designed by Lucy Bradridge, who has since worked on every Spymonkey production except A Christmas Carol in 2018.

== Cooped ==
In 2001, Spymonkey and McCrystal created their second-show, Cooped. This is a Gothic Romance, inspired by McCrystal's childhood love of the American gothic soap, Dark Shadows. In Cooped, 'a young girl arrives at a remote railway station in the heart of darkest Northumberlandshirehampton to take up her position as confidential secretary to the reclusive Forbes Murdston. Beautiful, fawn-like, swinging, but a hostage to passion, Laura knows now that life – and love – will never be the same again...And her an orphan!' The play is again supposedly written by the actor-manager Murdston (Park), who has once more miscast three unsuitable performers – the Spanish soap star Alfredo Gravés (Basauri), the German Expressionist Udo Keller (Kriess) and the pop diva Mandy Bandy (Massey).

Cooped opened with a sell-out run at the Edinburgh fringe festival, and received almost universal acclaim from the critics. Lucy Wray reviewed a performance at the Leicester Square Theatre when it was revived in 2013: 'Petra Massey's sassy Mandy Bandy downplays her role as ingénue Laura du Lay to begin with but she – and her ‘digestive problem’ – quickly become one of the main sources of humour. She continually demonstrates the delightful inability of her character to bend. Aitor Basauri plays narcissistic actor Alfredo Gravés, a man famous (in Spain and Paraguay) for playing the romantic lead in the high octane telenovela Hospital Tropical. When he is feeling particularly undervalued during the show, he brings on a television so the audience can admire an episode in which he seduces a nun. Stephen Kreiss plays the unpredictable German expressionist Udo Keller, who has an unconcealed hatred for Gravés. The sparring and spitting between the two is hilarious in its relentlessness.'

== Spymonkey in Las Vegas ==
In 2003, Spymonkey received a major setback, when their next project, Bless, failed to get touring funding from Arts Council England, despite a Total Theatre Award, support by the British Council for international touring, and appearances at the London International Mime Festival for three successive years. Dorothy Max Prior, editor of Total Theatre magazine, commented, 'It seemed that physical comedy fell through a gap in the funder's book, being popular with audiences of all ages apparently making them entertainment rather than art – a plight that at the time also adversely affected many street arts and circus companies (who likewise used the undervalued skills of clowning, mime and physical comedy).'

At the same time, Spymonkey and Cal McCrystal accepted an offer from Cirque du Soleil to create and perform the comedy numbers for Zumanity – Another Side of Cirque du Soleil, an adult cabaret show they were creating in Las Vegas. Julian Crouch wrote, 'Our loss is Las Vegas's gain.'

Spymonkey spent two years performing Zumanity in a specially built theatre in the New York-New York Hotel and Casino, where they were seen by half a million people. Spymonkey also appear in Lovesick, Lewis Cohen's 2004 film documentary about the creation of the show.

While in Las Vegas, Spymonkey made a short film, No Exit (originally known as Love Room), directed by Cal McCrystal. It is a physical comedy about sexual obsession, in which the lust-driven Aitor Basauri, Stephan Kreiss and Petra Massey pursue each other, to the music of Henry Mancini, around a Las Vegas hotel bedroom. Park, as Forbes Murdston, introduces the film, explaining that he has been inspired by the nightmare vision of Jean-Paul Sartre's No Exit: 'For these three souls, there is literally No Exit!' The film can be seen on youtube.

== Bless ==
Spymonkey's third show, Bless, in 2007, completed the Forbes Murdston trilogy and was their last collaboration with McCrystal. Murdston is now an idealistic priest, hoping to rehabilitate a serial rapist (Massey), an arsonist (Kriess) and an embezzler (Basauri) through drama therapy. For the first time, they were joined by a fifth performer, the designer and puppeteer Graeme Gilmour, who played a prison guard. His role was to pacify the arsonist, Kreiss, by shouting the word 'Stuttgart!' at him.

Andrea Campbell reviewed the play in Canada's FFWD magazine: 'With Bless, a dastardly backdoor examination of the men and women we now venerate as saints, Spymonkey completes the trilogy of hilarity it began with Stiff and continued with Cooped...Massey's over-the-top delivery, from her Mother Teresa look-alike to her pole-dancing St Catherine, tempers Basauri's understated comic timing. Kreiss's recurring transformation from an excitable pyromaniac to a pre-conditioned whimpering idiot is both sympathetic and riotously funny. The highlight of the cast, however is Park, who plays his delightfully altruistic priest with equal measures of honesty and lucid sarcasm....Park's Mr Murdston is both identifiable for his naiveté and hilarious for his sincerity.'

== Moby Dick ==
For Moby Dick, in 2009, Spymonkey worked with two new directors, Jos Houben, a founder member of Théâtre de Complicité, and Rob Thirtle, who was assistant director and dramaturg. The set, a large-scale recreation of the deck of the Pequod, was created by Graeme Gilmour, while Lucy Bradridge provided costumes and props.

Tim Arthur reviewed a production at the Lyric Hammersmith for Time Out: 'Looser and more chaotic than its earlier work, the whole thing is played in the excitable hinterlands of delirium. Hysterically funny from start to finish, the show is presented as a new work by Compagnie Tony Parks, a pretentious ensemble of European non-actors. This play within a play sways and staggers from disaster to catastrophe as the four actors attempt to play all the members of the crew of Ahab's doomed whaling ship, Pequod. This loose interpretation of the time-honoured masterpiece is a masterclass in physical comedy, sublime lunacy and exquisitely silly wordplay. Aitor Basauri, Petra Massey, Toby Park and Stephan Kreiss are probably four of the greatest clowns currently working in British theatre. Singing mermaids, dancing sea anemones and a strangely moving, spectacular finale all combine to make a vaudevillian tour de force.'

Moby Dick included one of Spymonkey's most celebrated physical routines, in which Stephan Kreiss as Queequeg the harpooneer is repeatedly defeated by the steps on the deck of the Pequod. "They don't have stairs where he comes from..." can be seen on YouTube.

== Love In ==
In 2011, Spymonkey created Love In, a cabaret show bringing together some of the funniest routines from previous shows. These included Petra Massey's pole-dancing Joan of Arc from Bless, and her orgasmic ping-pong ball firing act, which featured in both Zumanity and Cooped. There was also new material, in which the quartet appeared as the 'Love In Organisation', wearing cream outfits and beatific expressions. According to Dominic Maxwell in The Times, "There's some nice new material here, with their New Age talk, coy high fives – 'mid-fives', if you will – and the sort of audience participation that loosens you up rather than freezes you up. Mostly though it's a framing device for self-contained bits of business. This is proper clowning, conveyed with a sinewy physicality and a relish for upstaging: Jacques Lecoq meets Little and Large." The show was directed by Kit Green, with original material by Cal McCrystal.

== Oedipussy ==
For Oedipussy, in 2012, Spymonkey worked with Emma Rice, artistic director of Kneehigh Theatre, and her writing partner, Carl Grose. Rice has described the genesis of the show on the Rose Theatre blog: 'I knew that I wanted to find a robust narrative spine to hang Spymonkey's phenomenal creativity, anarchy and irreverence from. I love rules, even if they are only there to be broken. In order to stray enjoyably from the path, I believe that you have to know where and what the path is....Greek Tragedy is one of the strongest ‘paths’ in literature, famously combining time, place and action. For this reason, it seemed like a perfect place to start. I chose Oedipus because it is simply the best, and ‘pussy’ because it is exactly what it seems – saucy, tempting and a clear marker that this will be like no Greek tragedy that has gone before. Enter Barbarella, Bond, bikinis, balls, bling and bottoms....Spymonkey are my heroes: dedicated idiots and seers in the true sense.'

The combination of Bond, Barbarella and Greek tragedy inspired Lucy Bradridge to create 'absolutely breathtaking costumes which manage to maintain a realism of the era in the form of togas, chitons & armour; in contrast with the futuristic leotards, shoulder pads and platform shoes, bodysuits, shepherds cloaks and woollen pants with critter like sheep balls, Egyptian beards, hats and tunics, as well as the majestic and refined clothes of the Theben and Corinthian kings and queens.'

The play was reviewed by Libby Purves in The Times, 'Stephan Kreiss the German is a manic Oedipus while Park, Petra Massey and the Spaniard, Aitor Basauri, dart through the other parts, making the most of the pillared set's narrow entrances to get props and headdresses stuck....Below the fluff of hilarity, the tragic core is never obliterated....When Oedipus's blinded eyes fall in long red ribbons, the coda 'The gods will have their way' is delivered flat, unexpectedly powerful....Some people will never 'get' Spymonkey. That is their loss. This is not just inventive comedy but an affirmation of all human weakness, enhanced by their maturity, two heavy accents, and the barking-mad fearlessness of Petra Massey, a woman who will do anything – anything! – that truly serves a joke or story, with or without clothes on. Joyful.'

== Spookshow ==
In 2013, Spymonkey created 'Spookshow', a site-specific commission at the Winter Gardens, Blackpool, for the Showzam Festival, a celebration of circus, magic and new variety. The show was reviewed by David Upton in the British Theatre Guide: 'Using back-projected imagery they descend into a mummy's vault, not forgetting to include a sand dance sequence; bloodily impale themselves, or sever limbs—with audience participation naturally—and wind it all up with an even more horrific Abigail's Party piece than the original play. Not all of it works, but that is part of its shlock-horror appeal. The real star of the show has to be the gloriously kitsch setting which has probably never before been used to such fine effect.'

== Fleapit ==
Spymonkey have also made a pilot for a sitcom, in 2013, called Fleapit. It was written by Abigail Dooley and Emma Edwards, and directed by Chris Curtis. Fleapit is set in a failing art-house cinema, La Scala, managed by pretentious film buff Kenneth Forbes (Toby Park), aided by Lorenzo (Aitor Basauri) who runs an unusual kiosk, and Otto (Stephan Kreiss), the naked machete-wielding projectionist. The cinema has recently been bought out by the cinema chain, Cinegiant, who have sent Deborah Reynolds (Petra Massey), their Interim Transitional Co-ordinator, to implement changes. The eccentric staff struggle to adapt their quirky world to Cinegiant's corporate vision. Pastiches of films, including Eraserhead and Attack of the 50 Foot Woman, are woven into the narrative, reflecting the characters' fears, fantasies and failings. Spymonkey play all the characters in the films seen on screen at La Scala and in the movies playing in the heads of the cinema staff. The pilot, which has been shown in cinemas as a pre-movie short, can be seen on Vimeo.

== The Complete Deaths ==
In May 2016, Spymonkey staged The Complete Deaths, which previewed at the Royal & Derngate in Northampton and premiered at the Theatre Royal Brighton as part of the Brighton Festival. In the show, marking the 400th anniversary of Shakespeare's death, they performed all 75 of the playwright's onstage deaths, down to the 'black ill-favoured fly' killed in Act III Scene 2 of Titus Andronicus . The company worked with a new director and writer, the conceptual theatre guru Tim Crouch, who is also based in Brighton. Reviewing the show in The Stage, Natasha Tripney wrote,'The pairing of Spymonkey with director Tim Crouch turns out to be inspired. The show contains moments of physical brilliance but also some equally entertaining repurposing of live art tropes....The best moments are when it manages to feel both like a Spymonkey show and a Tim Crouch production at the same time, a bloody marriage of slapstick and something more probing about the staging of death: the extinguishing of life and light. But it never entirely removes its tongue from its cheek; the production's main aim is to make its audience laugh, which it does, often. We laugh with them at death.'

Sarah Hemming reviewed The Complete Deaths in the Financial Times: 'The history plays become a whistle-stop tour of extinction. A merciless official sits at a desk activating a giant buzzer when anyone bites the dust. Attempts at serious artistry — a Pina Bausch-style Macbeth, Aitor Basauri's "proper" Shakespearean acting, Toby Park's stern pronouncements about the artist as "agitator" — are all undercut by the inescapable power of the ridiculous. But the meta-theatrical nonsense disguises a genuine meta-theatrical exploration. Sneaking in under the pratfalls is a sincere investigation of how theatre can — and does — measure up to death. Actors can eat, sweat and weep for real on stage, but they cannot die. Stage deaths are inherently absurd. And yet. Hamlet "dies" in a bloodbath, but not before Shakespeare has brought him — and us — to contemplate the meaning of mortality.'

== A Christmas Carol ==
In 2018, Spymonkey staged their adaptation of A Christmas Carol at the Liverpool Everyman. This was directed by Ed Gaughan, who co-wrote the show along with Spymonkey, Sophie Russell, Mathew Crosby and Alice Power. Toby Park played Scrooge, with Aitor Basauri, Petra Massey and Sophie Russell playing multiple roles around him. In her Guardian review, Catherine Love wrote, "It's silly. Very silly. Dickens keeps reading from the wrong book. The Ghost of Christmas Past wants to be in a horror movie. Mr Fezziwig is played as a Cuban drug lord....The Sisyphean task of performing Dickens’ tale with a cast of just four becomes a running gag, as the quartet of performers wriggle frantically in and out of costumes and wigs. Getting the Cratchits’ brood of six around the table for Christmas dinner is a particularly riotous challenge." The Liverpool Echo described the show as "a joyous, daft, self-aware and remarkably funny Christmas show which is the perfect feast for grown-ups and older kids who aren't too keen on the traditional panto and can survive the odd naughty word unscathed."

== Cooped/Hysteria ==
In 2019, Spymonkey celebrated their 20th anniversary with a revival of Cooped, which toured the UK in May and June. To avoid causing offence, Laura du Lay's dream sequences, involving Hassidic Jews and Chinese martial arts fighters, were replaced with quarrelling monks and two scenes recycled from Bless. Petra Massey then returned to Las Vegas to play Boozy Skunkton, host of Spiegelworld's Atomic Saloon Show, directed by Cal McCrystal. Meanwhile, the Spymonkey revival continued, with Anne Goldman replacing Massey as Laura du Lay. The show, rebranded as Hysteria, had a two-month Autumn run at the Straz Center Tampa, Florida.

== Stephan Kreiss ==
In August 2021, the company announced that 'Spymonkey's friend, longstanding collaborator and irrepressible clown genius Stephan Kreiss has died. He died suddenly and unexpectedly on Monday 16 August, following a short illness....The company are all trying to come to terms with this devastating news. He leaves an enormous hole in the world of comedy theatre....His absurd, anarchic sense of humour and consummate physical comedy skill earned him the admiration of both his profession and international audiences' Paul Hunter of Told by an Idiot paid tribute to Kreiss on his website: 'Stephan was one of the funniest performers I ever had the privilege to see, and he did what all great clowns do - he made it look effortless. He first made me laugh in The Right Size's Penny Dreadful in 1993 and continued to do so for the next 28 years. I shall never forget his repeated attempts to get up some stairs aboard ship in Spymonkey's glorious version of Moby Dick, the whole audience was helpless with laughter willing him to do it again, which of course he did.'

== Hairy ==
The loss of Kreiss, and long-term absence in Las Vegas of Massey, led Park and Basauri to shift their creative focus from performing to directing. In 2023, they directed Spymonkey's first children's show, Hairy, a co-production with London's Polka Children's Theatre and Worthing Theatres and Museum. The cast comprised Jasmine Chiu, Katie Grace, Matthew Faucher and John-Luke Roberts, playing brightly coloured bickering hair follicles (Hairnry, Hairmione, Hairriet and Al). In his Time Out review, Andrzej Lukowski described the piece as "a totally out-there hour of performance...defined by its hysterically off-the-cuff interactions with the audience, who the performers steadfastly refuse to acknowledge to be any younger than them. In particular, John-Luke Roberts is the show's messy heart and soul as the exasperated jobsworth Al, who happily bickers and quibbles with five-year-olds, often threatening to derail the show totally as audience discipline breaks down and his fellow actors start to corpse madly."

== Orpheus in the Underworld ==
In 2023, Park and Basauri also directed Jacques Offenbach's operetta, "Orpheus in the Underworld" for the Vienna Volksoper. Park described the operetta as "a perfect fit for our comedic signature. As a parody of antiquity and a travesty of myth, the play presents a world that everyone knows and intelligently turns it on its head. That's exactly how our performative language and form of comedy work too!". According to the Wiener Zeitung, the piece was "a triumph of comedy" in which Offenbach appears as a character "who, in his vain search for his statue, staggers through the action and gets on everyone's nerves – except the audience, who are thrilled by Marcel Mohab's comedic performance. It is rare to hear such loud laughter in an opera house."

== The Frogs ==
In 2023, Basauri and Parks reunited on stage in a new Spymonkey production of Aristophanes' The Frogs, continuing the theme of a journey to the Greek underworld. The play was adapted by Carl Grose, who had previously written Oedipussy, and directed by Joyce Henderson. The Time Out review described this as a version of The Frogs that was "faithful to the original in spirit and plot, as well as a play about Spymonkey staging The Frogs, as well as a play about Spymonkey the company itself. Once a troupe of four core members, Petra Massey ‘went off to Las Vegas’ and Stephan Kreiss died in 2021, leaving just Park and Basauri to figure out what the company is in its current form. The third cast member, Jacoba Williams, playing all the other parts, encourages them to embrace being a duo by turning to the world's first double act, Dionysus and Xanthias." In The Observer, Clare Brennan described The Frogs as "an audacious staging with a tragicomic present-day backstory." Dominic Cavendish in The Telegraph praised the rapport of Park and Basauri, "the former combining neurosis and bombast, the latter a master of deadpan, effete daintiness and flaunted hirsuteness." In his Chortle review, Steve Bennett declared that "the real stars of the show...are the magnificent and inventive costumes from designer Lucy Bradridge."

The play premiered in January 2024 at the Royal and Derngate, Northampton, where the cast were joined by "the Royal and Derngate community chorus tap-dancing, ribbit-ribbit-frog style, in violently greenish-yellow rain cagoules." In February, it transferred, without the community chorus, to Kiln, London.

== Collaborations ==
Spymonkey have made several collaborations with other companies. Such work includes Miss Behave's Variety Nighty (2008) a variety cabaret show at the Roundhouse Camden; Palazzo (2008–9) a spiegeltent gastronomical cabaret in Amsterdam; Sandi Toksvig's Christmas Cracker (2010) at the Royal Festival Hall; Jekyll&Hyde(ish) a co-production with Lyric Hammersmith and Peepolykus, directed by Sean Holmes and written by Joel Horwood for Latitude Festival in 2011; Every Last Trick (2014) by Georges Feydeau (adapted by Tamsin Oglesby) a collaboration with Paul Hunter for Royal & Derngate Northampton; and Mrs Hudson's Christmas Corker (2014) at Wilton's Music Hall London, directed by Ed Gaughan. Toby Park and Aitor Basauri also directed and wrote the Finnish clown opera Fabulous Bäckström Brothers (2014) at Kapsäkki Music Theatre Helsinki; and directed physical comedy for Chichester Festival Theatre's production of Mack & Mabel (2015) starring Michael Ball.

== Spymonkey Workshops ==
Aitor Basauri has been a staff tutor at the École Phillippe Gaulier, Paris, since 2007. While touring the world with Spymonkey, Basauri, sometimes with Petra Massey, runs clown workshops, described on the company website: "You will learn how to begin to trust your instinctive and spontaneous self. We will teach you technically how to make people laugh through status play-offs, parody, improvisation and many more games and exercises." Basauri writes, "The performer who dares to stand before a crowd, unafraid to make mistakes and find pleasure in being wonderfully silly will reap fruitful rewards. In Spymonkey we strongly believe that it is in this moment that the seed for the best performances can begin. Once up there in front of the audience, that pleasure will take you from one funny mistake to the next, always happy, always optimistic to be playing in front of the audience."

Professor Jane Nichols, from the Yale School of Drama, provided a testimonial: 'Aitor has boundless energy. He loves what he teaches and he loves to teach. Aitor's easy, even temperament is as genuine and reassuring as it is compelling and empowering. His enthusiasm for what he does is evident and contagious. He approaches his students as he approaches the material...with humor, with clarity and authority, with knowledge, and with profound respect. Just as he and the other members of the remarkable Spymonkey approach weighty, sometimes perverse or tragic material with humor and a touch of grace, so too, as Aitor approaches a student's despair or resistance or personal tragedy he applies the same humor and grace. That his professional work aligns dignity with absurdity is testimony to his genius as an artist. That he, as an artist, is dedicated to eliciting that same sensibility from his students is testimony to his depth as a humanist, – and to his commitment to education.'

From 2015 to 2019, Petra Massey ran her own Spymonkey clown workshops in London, for Phoenix Futures, who help people recovering from addiction. These are 'aimed at anyone in stable recovery from drugs or alcohol. Petra will work on techniques that build your confidence, optimism, and creativity, and tap into what makes us laugh and why...finding your funny.'
