= SWNS Media Group =

UK-based media company

- Company type: Privately held company
- Industry: News agency
- Founded: Early 1970s
- Headquarters: London, UK
- Key people: Andrew Young, Paul Walters, Martin Winter
- Number of employees: 150 (2024)
- Subsidiaries: SWNS; 72Point; OATH; OnePoll; Talk to the Press; Pinpep; Content Covered; Play
- Website: swnsmediagroup.com

SWNS Media Group is a UK-based media company with two divisions, news agency SWNS (also known as South West News Service) and creative agency 72Point. The group operates a number of brands including OATH, OnePoll, Talk to the Press, Pinpep, LoveThis.News, Content Covered and Play.

The company operates from offices in London and Bristol. As of 2024, SWNS Media Group employed around 150 staff, including 50 producing editorial for SWNS.

== History ==
SWNS Media Group was founded as the Bristol Agency in the early 1970s by Roland Arblaster. It is now run by directors Andrew Young, Paul Walters and Martin Winter.

In 2010, SWNS launched the website SWNS.com (Small World News Service) as a first-hand source of current affairs and general interest news.

In 2016, SWNS acquired the regional agencies Masons News Service, Newsteam International, Ross Parry, National News, Centre Press and Northscot.

SWNS previous had a relationship with the alternative news website venture The London Economic, though it was understood not to leverage any editorial control.

Notable previous employees include Times editor Tony Gallagher, Telegraph editor Chris Evans, former Sun editor Stuart Higgins, former Sunday Telegraph editor Ian MacGregor, former Sunday Mirror editor Tina Weaver, Sky News correspondent Tamara Cohen and former Downing Street Director of Communications Lee Cain.

== Criticism ==
In 2023, SWNS Media Group's 72Point faced criticism over the transparency and ethics of its content generation practices following the discovery of articles attributed to 72Point's staff members on news websites.
