= Talk to the Press =

- Founded: 2008; 18 years ago
- Founder: Natasha Courtenay-Smith
- Parent: SWNS Media Group
- Website: us.talktothepress.com

Talk to the Press is a press and publicity agency that was founded in 2007 by media expert and former national newspaper journalist Natasha Courtenay-Smith.

The company provides an outlet for individuals who wish to sell their stories and specialises in feature stories of a personal nature that range from dealing with the credit crunch to teen prostitution.

== Coverage ==
Their articles predominantly appear in tabloid newspapers including The Daily Mail, The Sun and The Daily Mirror, and in women's magazines such as Closer, Reveal, Bella and Take a Break. In March 2010 Talk to the Press featured in the Cutting Edge documentary My Daughter Grew Another Head about women's magazines.

== Recognition ==
Articles about Talk to the Press have appeared in The Guardian and Independent newspapers. The journalists' newspaper The Press Gazette describes Talk to the Press as a website which aims to bridge the gap between the media and individuals with a story to tell.

== See also ==
- U.S. Newswire
- GlobeNewswire
