= Julian Bovis =

British artist and award-winning art director

Julian Bovis is a British artist and award-winning art director. He was born in Banbury, United Kingdom, and studied Architecture at the University of Plymouth.

== Magazines ==
Bovis worked on Melody Maker in 1990 before joining the BBC's now defunct pop magazine, No.1. In 1991 he was part of the Inside Soap magazine launch team before moving back to the United Kingdom to design the British version.

== Newspapers ==
In 1992 he redesigned the Daily Star, Lancashire Evening Post and Blackpool Gazette. In 1995 Bovis art directed the Edinburgh Evening News and he won Scottish Newspaper Design of The Year for the Dunblane massacre. After winning two more design awards in 1998 and 2000, Bovis joined the 2001 National Newspaper Awards judging panel. In 1999 he worked with broadcaster Jeff Randall as part of the Sunday Business newspaper launch team and in 2003 joined The Daily Telegraph as executive design editor where he was responsible for some of the newspaper's most noted front pages, including the award-winning Boxing Day edition of the 2004 Indian Ocean earthquake and the 2005 front page celebrating London's winning bid for the 2012 Summer Olympics. His work on the 7 July 2005 London bombings won The Daily Telegraph the European Newspaper Design Award.

== Internet ==
In the summer of 2006 he re-designed The Daily Telegraph's website increasing the monthly pages views from 41.6 m to 52.8 m and in 2008 oversaw the re-design of the Daily Sport newspaper and Sport Media Group's online titles.

== Awards ==
1996 Scottish Newspaper Design of The Year Edinburgh Evening News

1998 Newspaper Design of The Year for Sunday Business Newspaper Sunday Business

2000 Newspaper Design of The Year for Sunday Business Newspaper Sunday Business

2004 Newspaper Design of The Year The Daily Telegraph

2005 European Newspaper Award: The 7/7 London Bombings The Daily Telegraph

2015 John Ruskin Prize: Shortlisted [[Campaign_For_ Drawing]]
