= McChrystal =

McChrystal is a Scottish surname. Notable people with the surname include:

- Herbert J. McChrystal (1924–2013), United States Army general
  - Stanley A. McChrystal (born 1954), United States Army general and son of Herbert
- Mark McChrystal (born 1984), Northern Irish footballer

== See also ==
- McCrystal
