= SportsPro =

English media company

- Categories: Sports, sports business
- First issue: June 2008
- Company: SportsPro Media Ltd
- Country: United Kingdom
- Language: English
- Website: sportspro.com

SportsPro is a brand of Henley Media Group, and a London, UK based media company for the sports industry in digital and events.

== History ==
SportsPro was founded by journalist and publisher Tom Rubython in 2008 to replace BusinessF1, Rubython's previous magazine. This transformed the publication into a business title that covered the entire sports industry as opposed to just Formula 1. The magazine was sold to London-based Henley Media Group in February 2009.

== Digital ==
The SportsPro Media website and newsletters are sources of industry news and cover sport business appointments, developments, bids and deals across Sponsorship & Marketing, Broadcast & OTT, Technology, Finance & Investment, Major Events & Sustainability, and Women's Sport. A subscription is required in order to read all the news articles available online.

SportsPro also hosts podcasts.
