= Hyperdrive (British TV series) =

British science fiction television sitcom

- Created by: Kevin Cecil; Andy Riley
- Starring: Nick Frost; Kevin Eldon; Miranda Hart; Stephen Evans; Dan Antopolski; Petra Massey
- Country of origin: United Kingdom
- Original language: English
- No. of series: 2
- No. of episodes: 12 (list of episodes)

Production
- Running time: 29 minutes

Original release
- Network: BBC Two
- Release: 11 January 2006 – 16 August 2007

Hyperdrive is a British television science fiction sitcom broadcast by BBC Two in 2006 and 2007. Set in 2151 and 2152, it follows the crew of HMS Camden Lock as they stumble through their heroic mission to protect British interests in a changing galaxy.

The series was written by Kevin Cecil and Andy Riley, directed by John Henderson and produced by Alex Walsh-Taylor. The working title was Full Power. The first episode was broadcast on BBC Two on 11 January 2006. A second series began on 12 July 2007 on BBC Two. The series is available on CW Seed, iTunes and Amazon Prime Video in the US.

== Cast and characters ==
- Nick Frost plays the character of Space Commander Michael "Mike" "Lucky Jack" "Hendo" Henderson. According to the official website of the series, Henderson's "Space Force File" describes Henderson's career arc this way: "Henderson rose through the ranks in exactly the way we say people can in the recruitment ads, yet endeavour to prevent in practice. Henderson shows initiative; always a dangerous sign." It also says Henderson's education was received at Dagenham Secondary Modern and New Portsmouth Cadet Camp. The website further describes Henderson as an idealistic explorer, eager to meet new races, and feels he is undervalued given his low-priority assignments. Frost's character also has a recurring theme, his favourite show, Captain Helix. He is very protective of his Commander's chair, which he refers to as "Spinning Jenny".
- Kevin Eldon as First Officer Eduardo Pauline York – a brilliant scientist and tactician, second in command of the Camden Lock. He is also a borderline sociopath, obsessed with and taking immense joy in violence, needing only the slightest provocation to attack someone. He believes in a hardline doctrine and feels Commander Henderson is too lenient regarding the crew and application of regulations. He does not trust Technical Officer Jeffers, and has the ability to hold his breath for seven and a half hours to avoid the effects of sedative gas. He also shows great affection towards Sandstrom, appearing to be in love with her at certain points in the show, even becoming jealous when Vine is kissing Sandstrom in his "Pub-conscious". Like his friend Henderson, York also watches Captain Helix. At times, he can be quite poetic when describing acts of violence.
- Miranda Hart as Diplomatic Officer Chloe Alice Teal. Teal has an obvious crush on Commander Henderson, who has not responded to her advances. Teal's skills as a diplomat could be questioned, as during the episode Hello, Queppu, her drunken outburst results in the Queppu imprisoning the three senior officers of the Camden Lock. She failed her final exam to become an officer, and is only present on the Camden Lock as her father is an ambassador. In series two it is revealed that Teal is a devout agnostic, a belief which has apparently become a more formal religion in the future. She is also the yoga instructor on the ship.
- Stephen Evans as Navigator Dave Vine. Vine's greatest apparent achievement to date is purchasing a planet in an auction. The planet was quickly renamed Vineworld with such locations as Vine City 1 and Vine Ridge. Vine is a quiet member of the crew, uncomfortable with standing up to the outgoing personality of Jeffers or the authoritarianism of York. He is a collector of 1990s "antiques", believing it to be a simpler time; this is reflected by his "pub-conscious", which is the only dream he has, a pub in 1995, where it is revealed that he, like York, is attracted to Sandstrom.
- Dan Antopolski as Technical Officer Karl Jeffers, an easy-going and lax member of the bridge crew who has been placed in command of the Camden Lock on at least two occasions by Commander Henderson. He dislikes York and makes written notes on all the senior officer's mistakes. Jeffers has a liking for alien music; in particular, he enjoyed listening to the Lallakiss war anthem, "Kill the Humans", whilst on duty.
- Petra Massey as Sandstrom – an "enhanced human", a cyborg interface needed to ensure the Camden Lock keeps functioning. She agreed to have her body and mind modified in exchange for the Space Force paying off her student loan, assuming the offer would not be made if the procedure was not safe. Her personality was then overwritten and she functions much like an android, although chocolate seems to have an adverse emotional effect on her, leading to hypersexuality. She seems to have a lot of affection for York, and is much more obvious about her feelings for him than he is about his for her. She gets very jealous whenever another Enhanced comes on board. She appears to interact with the ship via deliberate dance-like movements, and rubbing or stroking the luminescent tubes that surround her usual working space.
- Maggie Service as a variety of Computer Voices. These serve primarily as throwaway lines and interstitials, and include user interfaces (To access the toilet, enter the second, fourth and eighty-third numbers in your security code) and shipwide announcements (Attention all crew: Today is Take Your Clone to Work Day. If you don't have a clone, go and see the Clone Officer on Level 7). In series two, other computer voices are played by Ewan Bailey.
- Waen Shepherd as Gareth Stannis, the actor who plays the title part in the television drama Captain Helix, watched obsessively by Captain Henderson in the privacy of his cabin as a source of emotional comfort. Captain Helix – who resembles a somewhat camper version of Doctor Who – may also not be quite what he seems.

== HMS Camden Lock ==
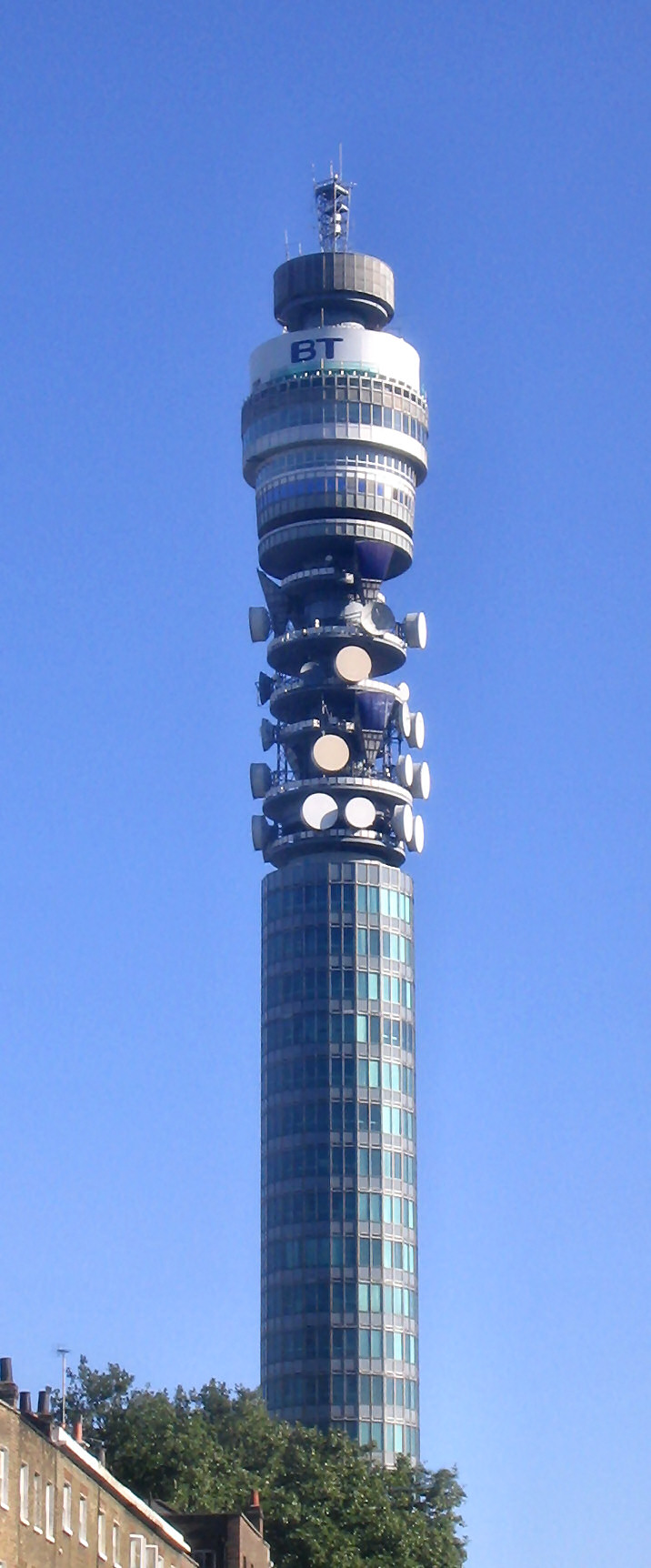
The shape of HMS Camden Lock is based on the BT Tower

The design for HMS Camden Lock was based loosely upon the BT Tower in London. It is a 'Wendover' class ship and measures 376 m (1,234 ft) long by 90 m (295 ft) wide. The ship's registration is XH558 – the same serial number as the last flying Avro Vulcan bomber. Shuttlebay doors on the Camden are shown with the Union Jack embossed on them, which is part of the comic jingoism of the series. Camden Lock is the name of a lock on a canal in the real Camden in London.

The Camden Lock is powered by "P-Rods", with the P standing for Perfectly safe, although it is rumoured to stand for Plutonium. Her maximum speed is 170 Vs—any higher and the reactors overheat. Her maximum crush depth is 197 standard atmospheres (20,000 kPa).

The Camden Lock is armed with missiles and pulse weapons of some form. The laser guns wielded by her crew bear a striking resemblance to crutches.

The Green Javelins (a "space-o-batics" precision flying team that appear in Series 2, Episode 1) also use 'Wendover' class ships. (The Red Arrows are the Royal Air Force's aerobatic team.)

== Alien races ==
=== The Glish ===
The Glish are repulsive-looking, slimy creatures who like to communicate by drooling and licking. Commander Henderson causes a diplomatic conflict by not allowing the Glish ambassadors to rub their genitals on his face.

=== The Queppu ===
A Medieval-ish race living on a mostly desert planet. They have a pseudo-feudal society with monarchical (if not totalitarian) government. Typical dress includes jester-like bright red latex suits. The despotic and insane Supreme Ruler, played by Geoffrey McGivern, desires that everyone marvel at his civilization, for example, he possesses a "Doom Ray", with which he threatens Henderson, Teal, and York and at which he expects them to marvel. The "Doom Ray" apparently takes three days to disintegrate a single person and a week to recharge. Princess Lavya, played by Montserrat Lombard, bears a remarkable resemblance to Lucrezia Borgia. As revealed in "Artefact", they gained a space-faring capability after half of the population was sold as food to an insectoid species to 'grind up in their mandibles to feed to their larval young.' The Supreme Ruler described this as a good trade.

=== The Lallakkis ===
A pseudo-Medieval race. They dress in sombre brown leather, appear unkempt, have the mental capability of 10-year-olds, and are eager to play chicken and use violence at slightest irritation. Every war the race participates in, a battle song is written. One of their battle songs is "Kill the Humans", which includes a death threat for Commander Henderson in the lyrics. The race is possibly caricatures of the British Chav subculture, or the Ali G stereotype of youth.

=== The Bulaagh ===
A highly advanced race that is haughty, considers itself superior to other races. Less prone to violence than the Lallakkis, but nevertheless ally with the Lallakkis against Britain after Commander Henderson destroyed an asteroid disputed by the two races. They appear to communicate telepathically by touching a gem-like marking on their long chins.

=== The Red Shiny Robots of Vortis ===
A parody of the Star Trek: The Next Generation Borg. A race eager to absorb information and knowledge of various races, exterminating them in the process. They appear to be clad in red latex and they extract the minds of the lifeforms into the "data-sphere" which leaves the bodies dead, although it has the weakness of disruption if those who are having their minds "harvested" think of falsehoods (allusion to the Starfleet attempt to plant an optical illusion computational worm in the Borg collective in the I, Borg episode).

There is also a model of Red Shiny Robot of Vortis used for infiltration, designed to look like attractive women, though based on the episode, it's debatable whether they truly understand the concept of attractive.

=== The Engulfers ===
Extradimensional beings of pure energy, they consume atoms and excrete black holes. They are able to swallow spaceships whole.

=== The Scrane ===
Interstellar pirates who are interested in stealing the most lethal weapon the Space Fleet has at its disposal.

== Episode list ==
The original pilot episode was first named "Lepus" and later "Full Power", It starred Sanjeev Bhaskar as Henderson and Mark Gatiss as York, the rest of the cast was the same as in the series. It was directed by Armando Iannucci and was never broadcast.

=== Series 1 (2006) ===
No. overall	No. in series	Title	Directed by	Original release date
1	1	"A Gift from the Glish"	John Henderson	11 January 2006
2	2	"Hello, Queppu"	John Henderson	18 January 2006
3	3	"Weekend Off"	John Henderson	25 January 2006
4	4	"Asteroid"	John Henderson	31 January 2006
5	5	"Clare"	John Henderson	7 February 2006
6	6	"Assessment"	John Henderson	14 February 2006

=== Series 2 (2007) ===
No. overall	No. in series	Title	Directed by	Original release date
7	1	"Green Javelins"	John Henderson	12 July 2007
8	2	"Artefact"	John Henderson	19 July 2007
9	3	"Admiral's Daughter"	John Henderson	26 July 2007
10	4	"Harvest"	John Henderson	2 August 2007
11	5	"Dreamgate"	John Henderson	9 August 2007
12	6	"Convoy"	John Henderson	16 August 2007
