= Cal McCrystal =

Irish theatre director and actor (born 1959)

- Born: 6 August 1959 (age 66); Belfast, Northern Ireland
- Education: Royal Scottish Academy of Music and Drama; École Philippe Gaulier
- Occupations: Theatre director and actor
- Relatives: Damien McCrystal (brother)

Cal McCrystal is an Irish theatre director and actor. He is the brother of the journalist Damien McCrystal and the son of the journalist and writer Cal McCrystal. Following an early career acting in theatre, television, radio plays and commercials, McCrystal became a director specialising in comedy. His notable credits include Physical Comedy Director on the National Theatre's One Man, Two Guvnors starring James Corden and physical comedy consultant on Paddington and Paddington 2. In 2018, he directed a new production of Gilbert and Sullivan's Iolanthe for the English National Opera.

== Early career and acting ==
Born in Belfast, McCrystal spent "three idyllic years" living with his family in Teaneck, New Jersey, after his father had been assigned as a correspondent for The Sunday Times.

McCrystal trained at the Royal Scottish Academy of Music and Drama, winning a contract with Yorkshire TV upon graduation in 1981 to present young people's programmes. He had regular roles in various Saturday morning children's shows, including What's Up Doc? and Motormouth on ITV alongside Gaby Roslin, Andy Crane and Siobhan Finneran.

McCrystal also appeared in more than 30 TV commercials, including one for Hamlet Cigars in which he portrayed Sir Walter Raleigh as part of their long-running Happiness is a cigar called Hamlet campaign. His other TV work includes The Detectives, The Wild House and a 1997 BBC adaptation of The History Of Tom Jones, A Foundling. He also has performed multiple stage roles, including Hans in Spring Awakening at the Young Vic in 1984 and Florindo in The Servant Of Two Masters at the Sheffield Crucible in 1995.

On film, McCrystal has appeared in George Sluizer's Crimetime and as Principal Conway opposite Andrew Garfield and Emma Stone in Marc Webb's The Amazing Spider-Man 2.

== Comedy/Theatre director ==
After training under Swiss clown Pierre Byland and European clown-theatre guru Philippe Gaulier at École Philippe Gaulier, McCrystal moved into theatre directing. His first show was Let The Donkey Go with the innovative theatre company Peepolykus. It became the surprise hit of the 1996 Edinburgh Fringe festival and led to two more shows with Peepolykus, I Am A Coffee and the Chekhov spoof Horses For Courses.

Described as "Britain's funniest director", McCrystal's shows are known for their chaotic physical comedy elements and irreverence.

After Peepolykus, McCrystal went on to direct stage productions for the Cambridge Footlights, including their 1998 show Between A Rock And A Hard Place which starred Richard Ayoade and John Oliver, and The Mighty Boosh. Some of his most acclaimed work came with the internationally successful clown troupe Spymonkey. After directing the clown sequences for Cirque Du Soleil's touring show Varekai, McCrystal returned in an expanded role on the company's Las Vegas-based erotic cabaret Zumanity, incorporating Spymonkey as the show's comedy act.

In 2003, McCrystal directed an acclaimed production of Joe Orton's Loot at the Derby Playhouse. He returned to the Playhouse two further times for productions of Kafka's Dick and The Killing of Sister George, the latter starring British comedian Jenny Eclair and Carla Mendonça.

In 2011, McCrystal was invited by Nicholas Hytner to work alongside him as Associate Director on the National Theatre's production of Richard Bean's One Man, Two Guvnors, a reworking of Carlo Goldoni's 18th century Commedia dell'arte play The Servant of Two Masters. McCrystal's broad input into the production included staging the renowned slapstick dinner scene at the end of Act One and was highlighted as a significant factor in the show's success. Hytner wrote: "Much of what is funniest in One Man, Two Guvnors was created by Cal McCrystal, my associate director, who is a great master of physical comedy." McCrystal's title was changed to Physical Comedy Director for the production's West End and Broadway transfers.

In 2012, McCrystal became the first director since 1977 to be granted permission by Alan Ayckbourn to stage his play Mr. Whatnot for a 50th anniversary revival at the Royal Theatre (Northampton). The play received favourable reviews.

In 2014, he directed Noel Fielding in his stand-up show, An Evening With Noel Fielding, and Ambassador Theatre Group's Christmas pantomime Peter Pan starring English television personality Bradley Walsh at Milton Keynes Theatre.

Around this time, he also directed several productions at the Royal Court Theatre, Liverpool: Canoeing For Beginners in 2014, The Royal in 2016 and The Scouse Nativity in 2017.

In 2016, he was Comedy Director on the Royal Shakespeare Company's Don Quixote starring David Threlfall and Rufus Hound, with reviewers highlighting McCrystal's contribution to a production acclaimed as "joyous" and "exuberant".

Since 2017, McCrystal has directed award-winning Australian actor-writer Damien Warren-Smith in three solo shows featuring his clown character Garry Starr: Garry Starr Performs Everything, Garry Starr Conquers Greece/Greece Lightening and Garry Starr: Classic Penguins. The latter has had sell-out runs in the West End at Soho Theatre, the Arts Theatre and the Garrick Theatre.

In 2019, he directed a production of Lennox Robinson's Drama At Inish at the Abbey Theatre. The production was his first at the theatre.

In 2022, McCrystal's Ambassador Theatre Group production of Mother Goose starring Sir Ian McKellen and comedian John Bishop opened at Theatre Royal Brighton from where it transferred to the Duke of York's Theatre in the West End and toured regionally until March 2023.

In 2023, McCrystal directed the inaugural show of the newly renovated Lido de Paris, which reopened at the Lido Deux Paris. The show was Stephen Sondheim's A Funny Thing Happened on the Way to the Forum.

== Opera ==
In 2014, McCrystal directed his first opera, Life On The Moon, an adaptation of Joseph Haydn's Il Mondo Della Luna, for English Touring Opera.

In February 2018, he made his English National Opera (ENO) debut with Gilbert and Sullivan's satirical fantasy Iolanthe, which received extensive press coverage before the production opened. McCrystal was interviewed by The Daily Telegraph, The Sunday Times and The Times among others, and wrote a piece for The Guardian outlining his approach to Gilbert and Sullivan's operetta. Iolanthe was nominated for an Olivier Award in the Outstanding Achievement in Opera category.

Iolanthe garnered strong reviews and became a substantial hit for the ENO. The Financial Times praised the production as "an all-round, knockout success", and The Spectator described it as "a mischievous, daring production that produces the goods".

McCrystal returned to ENO in 2021 to director Gilbert and Sullivan's HMS Pinafore, which opened at the London Coliseum with Les Dennis in the role of Sir Joseph Porter. The production was nominated for an Olivier Award in the Outstanding Achievement in Opera category.

Both of McCrystal's ENO productions have been revived: Iolanthe in 2023 and HMS Pinafore in late 2025. British actress and comedian Mel Giedroyc joined the latter production in a non-singing role written for her by McCrystal and Toby Davies.

McCrystal has directed several other acclaimed opera productions: Le Comte Ory at Garsington Opera in 2021; The Merry Widow at Glyndebourne Opera Festival in 2024, which starred Danielle de Niese and was conducted by John Wilson; and L'Elisir d'Amore for Irish National Opera in 2025.

L'Elisir d'Amore opened at the Gaiety Theatre in Dublin before touring to the National Opera House in Wexford and Cork Opera House.

McCrystal's production of The Merry Widow was filmed by the BBC and broadcast on BBC 4 on Christmas Day 2024. HMS Pinafore was filmed for its original run for Sky Arts.

== Circus/cabaret ==
Since 2012, McCrystal has been director of Giffords Circus, the traditional English touring circus. His productions for Giffords include The Thunders in 2014, Xanadu in 2019, The Hooley in 2021, Les Enfants du Paradis in 2023 and Laguna Bay in 2025.

McCrystal has also devised and directed three comedy cabaret shows for the comedic theatre and contemporary circus company Spiegelworld: OPIUM and Atomic Saloon Show in Las Vegas and The Hook in Atlantic City.

Launched in 2018 as a new resident show for The Cosmopolitan, OPIUM underwent various changes with McCrystal at the helm and was eventually renamed OPM. It closed in 2023 after failing to fully recover from Las Vegas's Covid-impacted entertainment scene.

In 2019, McCrystal was asked by Spiegelworld to create a new resident show for The Venetian Las Vegas. Atomic Saloon Show opened at the Edinburgh Fringe before transferring to the Venetian in September 2019, where it continues to play twice nightly.

In 2022, McCrystal conceived and created The Hook, Spiegelworld's new permanent show for Caesars Atlantic City. The show opened in July 2022 and continues to play there in a bespoke 400-seat playhouse, erected on the site of the demolished Warner World Theatre.

== Films ==
McCrystal has served as a physical comedy consultant on several feature films, including The Dictator and The World's End. He was brought in by Andrew Garfield and Marc Webb to help devise comic sequences for The Amazing Spider-Man 2. Garfield described it as "a really cool thing" having McCrystal onboard the superhero sequel as a comedy expert.

McCrystal appeared in the sequel film Paddington 2, as Sir Geoffrey Wilcott. He also helped to create multiple scenes in the first Paddington film and its sequel Paddington 2 using a motion-capture suit. He is credited on both films as comedy consultant.

He has also directed a feature version of The Bubonic Play, adapted from a stage production he devised for the 2005 Edinburgh Fringe Festival with a cast including Mathew Baynton.

== Awards and nominations ==
=== Perrier Comedy Awards ===
Winner

- 1998 Best Newcomer, The Mighty Boosh

=== Olivier Awards ===
Nominations

- 2012 Best New Play, One Man, Two Guvnors

One Man, Two Guvnors received five nominations in total

=== Tony Awards ===
One Man, Two Guvnors received seven nominations in total

== Selected other work ==
Television

- Behind The Bike Sheds
- The Tenpercenters
- EastEnders
- The Bill

Theatre

- 1984: Willy Russell's Stags and Hens at the Chester Gateway Theatre
- 1997: Francis Flute in The Popular Mechanicals, directed by Geoffrey Rush, at the Arts Theatre, London
- 2023: The Hook at the Warner Theatre (Atlantic City)
