= Allister Heath =

French-born British journalist (born 1977)

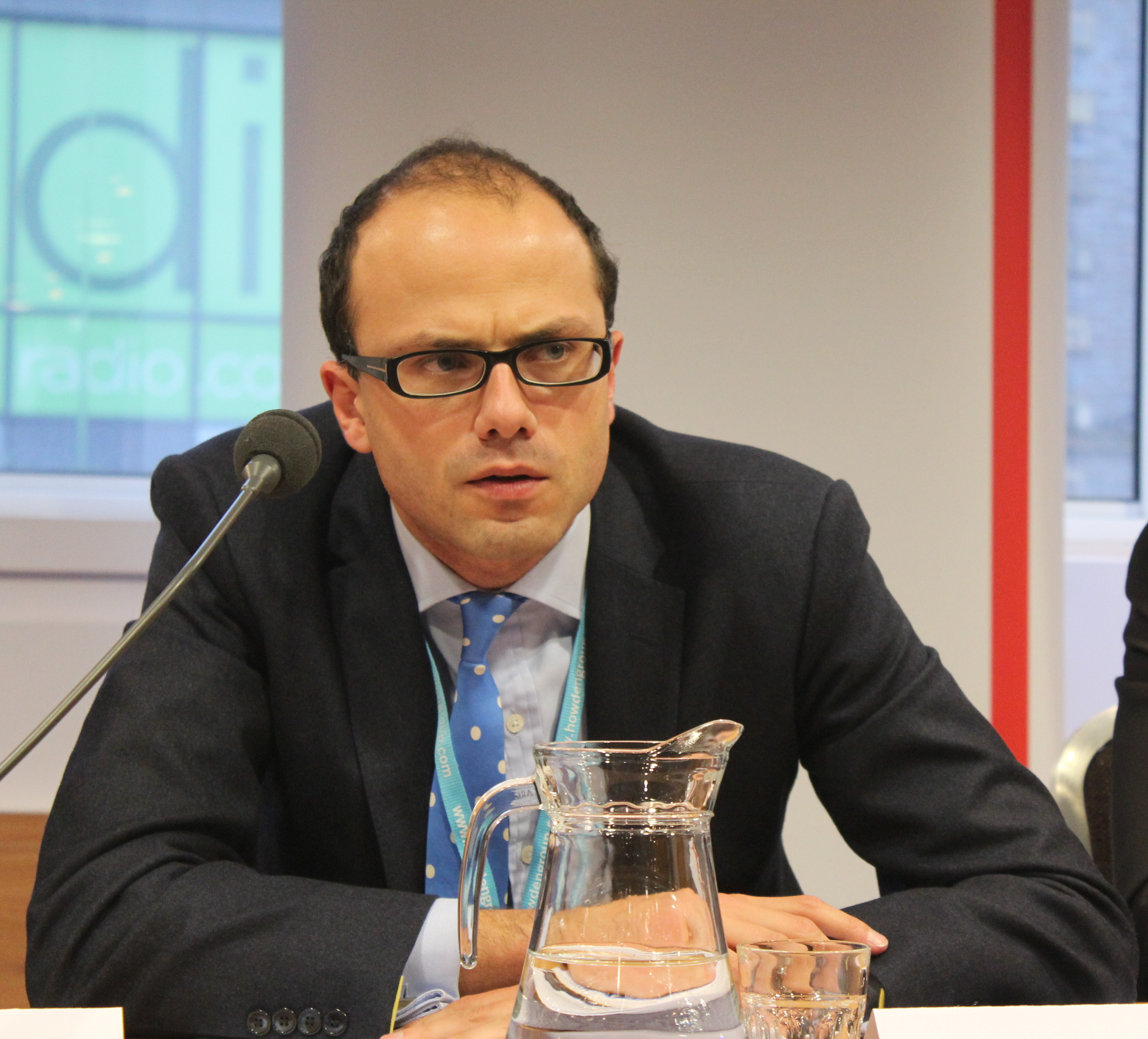
- Heath in 2012
- Born: Allister Georges Freund Heath; 1977 (age 48–49); Mulhouse, France
- Education: London School of Economics; Hertford College, Oxford
- Occupation: Newspaper editor

Allister Georges Freund Heath OBE (born 1977), is a French-born British business journalist, author and commentator. He has served as editor of the conservative newspaper The Sunday Telegraph since April 2017.

== Early life and education ==
The son of Alexander and Sylviane Heath, Allister Heath was born in Mulhouse in Alsace, France, to a part-British family. Heath was initially educated at the College Émile Zola, Kingersheim, followed by the Lycée Lambert, in Mulhouse. He lived there until the age of 17, when he moved to the United Kingdom to study economics at the London School of Economics (1995–1998), followed by a post-graduate MPhil in the subject at Hertford College, Oxford.

== Career ==
From 2000 to 2002, Heath was editor of the European Journal published by the anti-EU European Foundation of which he was also head of research. Since then, he has mostly worked in journalism. In 2006, he became an associate editor at The Spectator, continuing in this role until 2008. He was a contributing editor at the magazine from 2008 to 2011.

Heath undertook a number of roles at The Business, a London-based magazine. In 2002, he was its economics correspondent, then from 2002 to 2005 was economics editor and leader writer, rising to the roles of deputy editor (2005–06) and editor (2007–08). The publication closed shortly after his departure in 2008. Heath was editor of City A.M., a business newspaper, from 2008 to 2014. Since 2012, he has worked for The Daily Telegraph, initially as a columnist. From 2014 to 2017, he was deputy director for content and the paper's deputy editor. He became editor of The Sunday Telegraph in April 2017, replacing Ian MacGregor.

Heath has been Wincott Visiting Professor of Business Journalism at the University of Buckingham (2005–2007). He was chairman of the 2020 Tax Commission (a joint project between the Taxpayers Alliance and the Institute of Directors) from 2011 to 2012, authoring The Single Income Tax: Final Report of the 2020 Tax Commission for it in 2012. His first book, A Flat Tax: Towards a British Model (co-written with D. B. Smith), was published in 2006. In the book, he describes Karl Marx and Friedrich Engels as "two of history's most destructive and flawed thinkers". His second book, At a Price: the true cost of public spending, was also published in 2006. In July 2016, Heath spoke at the 60th Anniversary Gala of the Institute of Economic Affairs.

== Political views ==
In 2014, Heath wrote that it was "time to reject crony capitalism and embrace the real thing". In June 2018, he said that Cultural Marxism conspiracy theory was "running rampant".

In October 2019, Heath backed the Brexit withdrawal agreement negotiated by Boris Johnson, arguing "it is as good as it gets" and urging MPs to approve it. In December 2020, he said he believed Brexit was a "positive shock for Britain" and the time the country had spent in the EU was "a calamity for Britain". In June 2021, Heath held that the withdrawal agreement's Northern Ireland Protocol "was imposed on the UK by Brussels at the moment of our greatest weakness", arguing it should be renegotiated.

In September 2022, Heath welcomed the mini-budget submitted by the UK Chancellor of the Exchequer, Kwasi Kwarteng, with unbridled enthusiasm. In a front-page commentary in The Daily Telegraph, Heath wrote: "This was the best Budget I have ever heard a British Chancellor deliver, by a massive margin. The tax cuts were so huge and bold, the language so extraordinary, that at times, listening to Kwasi Kwarteng, I had to pinch myself to make sure I wasn't dreaming, that I hadn't been transported to a distant land that actually believed in the economics of Milton Friedman and F A Hayek." After the mini-budget triggered financial chaos in the UK, Heath wrote that Truss and Kwarteng were unlucky and the economy was going to crash anyway.

In September 2025, Heath was critical of Keir Starmer's position on Israel during the Gaza war, in response to the Hamas-led October 7 attacks, saying that Starmer had "declared war on Western values" and that "Israel is the one country that can never do right in the eyes of the Left."

In August 2026, Heath was critical of Restore Britain leader Rupert Lowe, calling him "a deluded egotist who is toxifying British politics, fanning the fires of racial and religious strife and risks handing permanent power to Andy Burnham's Leftist revolutionaries".

== Awards and recognition ==
In February 2012, Heath was announced as the winner of the Institute of Economic Affairs Free Enterprise Award for 2011.

In October 2017, the commentator Iain Dale put him at Number 87 on his list of "The Top 100 Most Influential People on the Right"'.

== Personal life ==
Heath married Neda in 2002; the couple have two daughters. He lists his recreation in Who's Who as "family".

Media offices
Preceded by Benedict Brogan	Deputy Editor of The Daily Telegraph; 2014–present	Incumbent
Preceded by Ian MacGregor	Editor of The Sunday Telegraph; 2017–present	Incumbent
