= Zumanity =

Cirque du Soleil show

Coordinates: 36°06′07″N 115°10′29″W

- Logo for Cirque du Soleil's Zumanity
- Company: Cirque du Soleil
- Genre: Contemporary circus
- Show type: Resident show
- Date of premiere: 20 September 2003
- Final show: 14 March 2020
- Location: New York-New York Hotel & Casino, Las Vegas

Creative team
- Creative Guides: Guy Laliberté (founder), Jean-François Bouchard (CCO of refresh)
- Writers and Directors: René Richard Cyr and Dominic Champagne
- Director of Creations: Andrew Watson, Gilles Ste-Croix (new staging)
- Creator and Costume Designer: Thierry Mugler
- Set Designer: Stéphane Roy
- Composer and Musical Director: Simon Carpentier
- Choreographers: Debra Brown, Marguerite Derricks, Dave St-Pierre (new staging), Yanis Marshall (refresh), Patrick King (2Men/specific acts), Stéphan Choinière & Sara Joel (body2body/body2body 2.0), Dwight Rhoden (specific acts), Philip Sahagun (Knife/2Men with ninjas)
- Lighting Designer: Luc Lafortune
- Sound Designer: Jonathan Deans
- Comedic Directors: Cal McCrystal, Spymonkey (specific acts), Wayne Hronek (new staging), Shannan Calcutt (Scotch Baggies/specific acts)
- Make-up Designer: Nathalie Gagné
- Photographer and Production Image Designers: Natacha Merritt, Keith Sadowski (refresh), Jorde Salomone (refresh), Peter Thompson (refresh)
- Acrobatic Equipment and Rigging Designer: Jaque Paquin
- Props Designer: Normand Blais
- Additional Lyrics and Scripting: Anna Liani, Robbie Dillon, Armand Thomas, Joey Arias, Christopher Kenney, Jamie Morris

Other information
- Preceded by: Varekai (2002)
- Succeeded by: Kà (2005)
- Official website

Zumanity (zoo-manity) was a resident cabaret-style show by Cirque du Soleil at the New York-New York Hotel and Casino on the Las Vegas Strip, in the theatre previously occupied by Michael Flatley's Lord of the Dance. The production was unveiled on September 20, 2003 (previews began on August 14, 2003), and its last performance was on March 14, 2020. It was announced on November 16, 2020, that the show would be closing permanently. It is the first "adult-themed" Cirque du Soleil show, billed as "the sensual side of Cirque du Soleil" or "another side of Cirque du Soleil". Created by René Richard Cyr and Dominic Champagne, Zumanity is a departure from the standard Cirque format. Intended for mature adult audiences only, it was centered on erotic song, dance, acrobatics, and comedy.

The inspiration for Zumanity came from multiple sources. Cirque du Soleil founder Guy Laliberté was offered the chance to create two new shows in Las Vegas, and wanted something completely new and original rather than multiple similar shows that would cannibalize off of each other's sales and audiences. Another reason was that the New York-New York Hotel and Casino wanted to make their entertainment appear more "trendy", and liked the concept of a more adult Cirque du Soleil performance.

Laliberté admits that the biggest reason to produce Zumanity was the opportunity to create something with edgier subject matter. He was interested in the idea of creating a show that explored human sexuality something at complete odds with the other, more family-oriented Cirque du Soleil shows. "Our previous shows have all been family-oriented and politically correct, which is great," Laliberté said, "but we're human beings, we won't hide it. We're a bunch of happy campers. We like to live new experiences. Zumanity deals with some of those experiences."

On February 22, 2022, Cirque du Soleil announced that a new show, Mad Apple, would replace the Zumanity show at New York-New York Hotel and Casino, which opened on May 26, 2022.

== Costumes ==
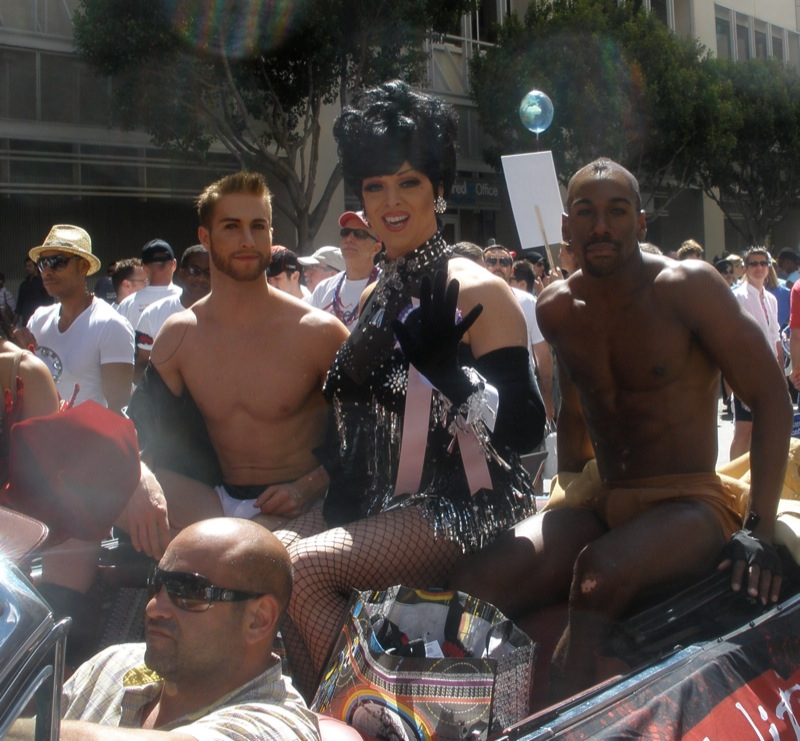
Zumanity float at the 2012 San Francisco Pride parade.

Thierry Mugler designed the costumes for Zumanity; he created the costumes to enhance the sensual atmosphere and heightened sexuality of the production. Many of the costumes are highly colorful, yet some are minimal to an extreme. Fur, feathers, leather, lace, fishnet stockings, velvet dresses, tiny corsets, cone bras, and plastic accessories were primary materials utilized to create the costumes' provocative appeal. Jonel's costume, for example, is made of stretch vinyl and is airbrushed to create a semi-nude effect; her bright red wig is made of expanded foam. Faun has fur on his pants made of toothbrush bristles, human hair, and yak fur. Molinier's long velvet dress was created by using a stencil and net onto which black silicone was applied. Though some characters are made to look entirely nude, the sex organs are fake pieces. Zumanity had Cirque's most expensive and elaborate costumes, the Rose Boy's g-string alone costing $75,000.

For a great selection of character costumes and concept art, see Le Grand Chapiteau - Zumanity - Personages

== The Human Zoo ==
The lobby was designed in European style, with an emphasis on curves. A long lighting fixture on the ceiling appeared to be made of strips of golden silk. One wall was lined with what appeared to be a burgundy, padded headboard, along which were peepholes that originally were conceived to show clips of erotic vintage films, but eventually showed promotional posters of the show. There was a large window filled with blue swirls, and a glowing, golden fixture in the wall that appeared to resemble labia. Another framed window appearing to feature branches or vines showcased the "Amsterdam Room," which had a performer in it, dancing and teasing the guests in the lobby to whom patrons could talk via a phone built into the wall. The lamps were elegant and attached to the wall by arms that appeared porous. There was a small nook with a couch you could lie on, usually with a performer. The grand staircase leading to the balconies also appeared to be made of vines, or even nerves, possibly symbolizing the sense of touch.

The theatre had 3 bars, or Eroticafés -- two on the ground floor, and one upstairs -- serving sushi and various drinks, the signature being the Zumanitini: 1 oz. Vodka Citron, 1/2 oz. Cherry Pucker, and a splash of Triple Sec, Sweet and Sour, and cranberry. Next to one bar was a small stage made up to look like a bedroom, where there was always a cast member beckoning to the guests from the bed. The restrooms were unique in that you would hear whispering and teasing in each stall. Unlike other shows, Zumanity had multiple performers roaming the lobby, always ready to playfully flirt and take photos.

Entering the theatre itself, you'd find yourself in a cabaret, smaller and more intimate than the other resident Cirque du Soleil Las Vegas shows. The stage appeared to be a marble parquet with elegant, red curtains and two spiral staircases on either side. Above the stage was a bridge from which the band played, that could move up and down. Many chandeliers hung around the stage, and the walls were lined with dimly lit lamps. The carpet featured naked women in a style resembling a Renaissance or Baroque painting. Around the back sides of the stage were barstools, and around the front circle of the stage were loveseats -- special options on top of the normal theatre seating.

When the curtains opened, a giant structure called "The Wave" was exposed. These were two massive, wavey screens whereon images could be projected. The screens could be moved into various positions.

The shop contained all sorts of novelties, from Zumanitini glasses to chocolate soap bars. Naturally, one could also find various adult-themed items.

== The Show: 2003 - 2005 ==
- Animation
  - "Through a series of scene transitions, this comedic quartet supplies the counterpoint to all that is erotic and provocative about ZUMANITY. In a show filled with serious sexual tension, Spymonkey is a reminder of the importance of having a laugh at ourselves and having fun in the bedroom!"
    - Spymonkey was composed of Toby Park, Petra Massey, Aitor Basauri Barruetabena, and Stephan Kreiss
  - Eliot Douglass plays a jazzy cabaret tune on the piano as the Molinier stands by with a cigarette. Zumans descend the spiral staircases to walk among the audience, with some stripping on stage. Luciene and Licemar Medeiros, twin sisters in showy French maid outfits, brush up against audience members in the aisles as they feed them strawberries. Antonio Drija, Zumanity's resident Gigolo, flirts with audience members, passes out calling cards, and takes polaroids. The Puritans, Spymonkey dressed up as Quakers, take to the stage protesting the show's obscenities, while ironically being a bit sexual themselves.
- Welcome, "Hello boys, hello girls"
  - "Half-lit cigarette, empty martini glass, all these chicks lined up in a row on a street with no name in a city that never sleeps."
  - The Puritans are booted off stage. Joey Arias, our "Mistress of Seduction" madame, emcee, and drag artist, sings a jazzy tune in her sensuous, smokey voice reminiscent of Billie Holiday. She then welcomes and warms the audience up for the coming show with laughs and very personal questions for the guests.
- Warnings, "Rules of the House"
  - Lonnie Gordon, acclaimed dance, pop, and R&B singer, takes the stage, singing a song that highlights some things about the effects of the show that may surprise audiences, and what is prohibited. Eventually, Corinne Zarzour, Zumanity's rock diva, would join her.
- Extravaganza
  - “Blaring horns and hammering drums announce the beginning of the fanfare. One by one the cast makes its fashionable entrance, parading down the catwalk in costumes every bit as vibrant, bold, and diverse as their spectrum of talents and personalities. It’s an incandescent introduction to the colorful cast of performers who will guide the audience on their journey into the world of ZUMANITY.”
- Wind and Wassa
  - "We summon the spirits of passion and hope."
  - "All at once a storm sweeps over the stage as Marcela [de la Vega Luna], Queen of the Wind, summons the spirits in a fevered flamenco dance. With smoldering intensity, her hypnotic trance stirs the soul, arouses the imagination and prepares the senses for an uninhibited transformation."
  - "Marcela awakens the unbridled passion in Wassa [Coulibaly]. Exploding into a vigorous African dance, her arms, legs and torso take on a primal energy of their own, flying erratically and erotically in rhythm to the intoxicating tribal pulse."
- Water Bowl
  - "Do you remember that first hint of something delicious and strange? Of water on parched lips? Or that very first glass of champagne? Do you remember how, in one magical moment, everything changed?"
  - "Abandoning their innocence, contortionists Gyula [Gyulnara Karaeva] and Bolormaa [Zorigtkhuyag] bathe in inhibition and taste love for the first time. Fluidly they glide through the water striking a sensual array of inconceivable poses to explore the limits of physicality, sexuality and creativity all at once."
  - Cirque's Amaluna would also showcase a water bowl act years later in 2012.
- Hoops
  - "Oh, innocence: so fleeting, so fragile. One day the sweet young thing, the next thing you know, you're soaking wet and lying naked in a hotel room in Vegas. Story of my life: 'what goes around, comes around.'"
  - "Julia [Kolosova] brings to life the school girl fantasy. She gyrates and swivels as she guides her hoops up and down her lithe frame, ultimately engulfing her body. Then, without warning, the dream takes flight as she soars through the air performing daring feats of aerial choreography."
  - Julia hula hooped in midair while swinging around the theatre.
- The Rose Boy
  - "I've been looking at all these beautiful, sexy, wonderful women up on stage tonight, and I know some of you are wondering, 'Where's the beef?' Does anybody want some roses?"
  - "Alex [Castro] peels away the tough exterior to expose his weakness... for the ladies. He tantalizes and teases the audience by revealing his chiseled body bit by bit in a sinfully seductive striptease."
- Pom Poms
  - Spymonkey comes out entirely nude (the privates were prosthetics) and teases the audience by covering themselves only by pom poms, which they remove to give quick flashes of their bodies. At one point, one of the members crawls over the audience's seats with his privates getting entangled in guests' hair.
- Body2Body
  - "These days I live for the elicit tingle of skin on skin, the taste of sweat, and the pungent scent of passion. How about you? Are there parts of your lover's body you've left unexplored, untouched, untasted? Well, my only question is, "What are you waiting for?'"
  - "Sara [Joel] and Stéphan [Choinière] entwine in a tantric, hand-balancing duet that underscores the beauty of sex. Featuring a breath-taking array of Kama Sutra-inspired maneuvers, their act portrays the discovery of a lover’s body with dramatic strength, flexibility and trust."
  - The artists maneuver their bodies into various shapes, making living, human sculptures. Body2Body can be related to hand-2-hand, although it is done quite differently. The performers use their entire bodies to lift each other, and the act has high emphasis on choreography.
- Expressions and Dislocation
  - Expressions: Interlude into Dislocation where the Fauna [Jesse Villa] breakdances on the stage to the percussion accompaniment of Larry Aberman.
  - Dislocation: "Limber Lothario, Moukhtar [Gusengadzhiev], performs on command for his sadomasochistic sirens, who derive pleasure from watching him squirm. Redefining flexibility, his elastic body bends, twists, and contorts into nature-defying positions that inspire both 'awes' and 'ows.'"
- Dance on TV
  - "Gorgeous good girl, Elena [Gatilova], breaks out of her shell to grab her lover’s attention. Turning up the heat on love gone flat, she ignites the scene with her feminine wiles, sultry gymnastics and dance to rekindle the flame and make her lover see her again as if for the very first time."
  - This act features a television set in the middle of the stage, with multiple men watching the sports game playing on the set. Elena dances on the TV, trying to get their attention. Eventually she succeeds and the sports game turns to static. Zumanity's other female dances take the stage, and they all remove their tops and dance on chairs for the men.
- 2Men
  - "Tumultuous lovers Patrick [King] and Johan [King Silverhult] tango in the throes of passion. Through their fierce choreography unfolds a love story between two deities, Love and War. Again and again they attract and repel in intense conflict until the magnetic energy between them becomes more than they can bear."
  - Patrick and Johan perform a violent dance in a cage, symbolizing fighting. They are sparring over Marcela, who dances in the background in a flamenco dress, egging them on. As the fight goes on, it becomes softer and more sensual, and the brilliant red light behind Marcela starts to grow smaller. The fighters eventually lose all focus on Marcela, give one big, passionate kiss, and walk off the stage together, to Marcela's great dismay.
- Revenge of the Doll
  - Spymonkey reappears to shed their sexual inhibitions. One of them carries a sex doll onto the stage, preparing to have fun with it. He is chased by a few of the others dressed as policemen. When he comes back out, the doll comes to life to hump the audience members and the cast. Originally, there was also a segment where Spymonkey used gags to mock some of the previous acts, much like in Cirque's Dralion.
- Savage Love, Market, Fire, and Aerial Straps
  - "Are you still hiding from monsters under your bed? Skeletons in your closet? Follow me to a place where rules are broken and pleasure dances with pain. Just be careful what you ask for... you might just get exactly what you deserve."
  - Market, part 1: First, arabesque music plays as the Boteros juggle dildos, Zumans flail in chains, and Jonel Earl dances with a whip. The interlude resembles a sadomasochistic circus. This act originally contained 2 pythons, Adam and Yves, some of Cirque's only animals ever used in its shows. This interlude would remain in the show until its closing.
  - Fire: Fire was only in the show for a few weeks, but it featured Heidi Good and Jila Alaghamandan in very showy S&M leather outfits as they performed a fire dance. Androgynous Cape ["Almukatab" Jacobo Espina] also danced with one of the snakes. This act was removed from the show because Guy Laliberté, Cirque's founder, did not want a fire act in the show. The smoke left in the air after the act also made it difficult for the Straps artist to perform.
  - Savage Love: It is unknown when exactly this act was in the show, but it is believed to be either the replacement for Fire or a back-up act. This act featured Vanessa Convery and Ugo Mazin violently dancing in the 2Men cage. See reference for a video of the act.
  - Market, part 2 (also called Inferno in press releases): "Pleasure dances with pain as ZUMANITY’s resident gigolo, Antonio [Drija], feels the wrath of the women [Jonel Earl, Laetitia Ray, Vanessa Convery, Sophie Ayache, and Agnès Roux] he has scorned. Captured by a militia of vixens in a barred prison cell he finds himself caught in the middle of rough-and-tumble romantic revenge."
    - This act replaced either Fire or Savage Love, and was in the show until around 2005. There was also a version of it that used 7 men and 1 woman.
  - Straps: "Laurence [Jardin], alone on stage in fragile silence, is bound by her straps. An exercise in self-inflicted pleasure and pain, she uses the leather contraption to tease and torture herself. All the while she watches her bonds ease into auto-erotic aerial maneuvers. Scored by heavy breathing, gentle moans of ecstasy and the friction of her straps, Laurence’s self-satisfying bondage flight draws to a climactic finale."
    - From 2005 and onwards, Market, referred to above as "part 1," would lead directly into straps.
- S&M Hoedown
  - Spymonkey comes onstage dressed in S&M leather with various pain-inducing items. They do a hoedown dance while inflicting pain on themselves as a sexual stimulant.
- Sheets and Tissus
  - Sheets: An opening interlude to Tissus, this is a short ballet where the dancers had silken, white sheets on their hands that they danced with.
  - Tissus: "Though he desperately tries to catch her attention, Alan [Jones Silva] passes unnoticed by the glamorous goddess Olga [Vershinina]. Finally, the once unattainable object of his affection is within arms reach as their two worlds entwine mid-flight in mesmerizing aerial dance."
- Midnight Bath
  - "Let your imagination have free reign[sic]. Let your fantasies take you to unexpected places."
  - "With the suggestion that you can’t keep love locked up in a bedroom, Vanessa [Convery] and Ugo [Mazin] give imagination free reign[sic and let fantasy take them to unexpected places. Using milk as their medium they caress each other’s flesh in this luscious lactic sexual experiment."
    - As the name suggests, this act was performed in a bathtub in the middle of the stage. The act was opened by another jazz number from Joey Arias: "Touch me, hold me, never let me go."
- Orgy, has been referred to in the show as Lazy Susan of Sex, Sex Station 69, Garden of Delights, and Zumanitarium
  - "The cast emerges from every orifice of the theatre in search of hedonistic prey. In duos, trios (and some flying solo), they assume a smörgåsbord of sexual positions on the Lazy Susan of Sex, where they touch, stroke, moan and embrace until the tension builds to an orgasmic conclusion."
    - This is an audience participation segment. Antonio would lead two members of the audience onto the stage, usually one male and one female. Each would be given to a few of the cast members that would try to arouse them based on their sexual orientation. Antonio usually caressed and rubbed up against the female as the emcee would ask personal questions and make sexual innuendos. The emcee would then move on to the male and try to arouse him. If he was okay with it, his shirt and pants would be removed by the time the emcee got to him. Joey Arias would stick her microphone into his underwear and speak into it.
- Pacemakers and Finale
  - "Bringing the show full circle, veteran cast members Birgit and Fleming [Thomsen] surprise the audience with an astonishing hand balancing adagio. Together they defy time and gravity with physical feats of strength, flexibility, and control. This real-life couple, married for over 48 years, is a testament to the enduring, everlasting nature of true love."
  - Birgit and Fleming were sitting in the audience and brought on stage as "guests," when in reality they were cast members and would break into acrobatics.

== The Show: 2005 - 2015 ==
There were various changes throughout 2005, from acts to costumes. The Body2Body artists left the show and the act was replaced by Hand-to-Hand. Spymonkey also left and the "Sexperts," Dick and Izzy, replaced them for the remainder of Zumanity's run. While Pom Poms stayed in the show through 2014 (and would feature Dick, Izzy, and the Boteros), all of the other clown acts were new. Pacemakers and Extravaganza would also be changed around 2006, when Extravaganza was moved to the end of the show and Pacemakers left permanently.

- Dick and Izzy: "Zumanity’s resident sex therapists, Dick [Nicky Dewhurst] and Izzy [Shannan Calcutt] aim to please with their sexy and silly methods engaging the audience in a hilarious round of not-so-innocent repartee. The sexual tension runs high as Dick, a French sex merchant, peddles his wares, while Izzy, his wife!, searches the audience night after night for a boyfriend."
  - Animation: Instead of the Puritans, Dick and Izzy come out dressed in 1950s-esque prom outfits. Both hit on various members of the audience and try to swing with the couples. They make sexual innuendos with bananas and fence with dildos.
  - Scotch Baggies!: Izzy pitches her new business - little plastic sandwich baggies that she fills with scotch (in reality, tea) to use instead of breast implants. She removes her top and has one of the male members from the audience hold the baggies to her breasts as she tapes them to herself. "You are not going to see this at the Celine Dion show."
  - Knives (possibly called Sex Toys): Volunteers from the audience is strapped to a board and blindfolded while tricked into thinking knives are being thrown at them.
  - Vegas Hook-Up (also referred to as Express Dating): Audience members are once again brought on stage. Dick and Izzy explain that it's better to forget all of the normal wooing on a first date and go straight for the bedroom. They teach the audience members how to turn each other on. Then, they make them get onto a bed and ride each other as they sink into the stage and silly string shoots up.
- Hand-2-Hand
  - "In an aggressive but intimate hand-balancing duet, [Joanie Leroux-Côté] and [Nicolas Alain Michel Besnard] entwine in a powerful act with breathtaking acrobatic-inspired manoeuvres. Their flawless movements thrust the two kindred spirits into a provocative tale of lust."
- I Like It
  - Back-up act where Joey Arias would sing another jazz song.
    - "Oh, What a Feelin" may have also been sung more than during Joey's final performance.
- Mistress of Sensuality, Edie
  - "Part showgirl, part cabaret queen, Mistress of Sensuality Edie [Christopher Kenney] plays hostess to your every fantasy. As the sun sets and desires come alive, Edie uses her signature blend of sass and sensuality to guide the audience through the erotic escapades that make up the world of Zumanity."
  - Joey Arias left the show at the end of 2007, and Edie became Zumanity's main emcee for the rest of the run.
- Roue Cyr (Cyr Wheel)
  - "Jonas [Woolverton] is brought to the stage on his knees. A slave to love and forced to perform for his Mistress, he spins and turns inside his wheel while she cracks her whip. He is eager to please, even donning a blindfold for some of his tricks. One can only hope the pleasure is worth the pain he receives..."
- Handbalancing
  - "Dima ["Shine" Bulkin] is alone, going in circles around his pole. He has just about given up on love when he meets a lovely contortionist who seems to fit into his world. She brings him back to earth in this beautiful act."
- Chains
  - "Brandon [Pereyda] brings fantasies to life. He flies and defies gravity on his chains. Dreams take flight as he soars through the air, performing daring feats of aerial athleticism choreography and strength."
  - Though this act is associated with the refresh in 2015, Zumanity's 2012 b-roll shows this act being used. It was most likely a back-up or rotational act until it was made a main act in 2015.

== The Refresh: 2015 - 2020 ==
On January 20, 2015, a refresh of the show was introduced to the public in which roughly 30% of the show was changed from its original concept. Certain acts, including Hoops, Dance on TV, Pom Poms and Tissus (in its original form) were retired. Entirely new acts included chains, Aerial Dream, and Perfect Jam. Tissus was changed into a solo act and the Rose Boy evolved into Magnum, mostly the same routine but the dancer became a secret agent. Yanis Marshall choreographed new dance segments throughout the show, and there are multiple acts in which men dance in high heels (including Wind, Perfect Jam and for a short amount of time, the 2Men act). The show also features new and updated music, costumes, comedic acts, characters and artists.

- Come Together
  - "All at once, a storm sweeps over the stage as three characters, Spirits of the Wind [Marie Ndutiye, Tiffany de Alba, Arnaud Boursain], summon passion, desire and lust in a fevered dance. With smouldering intensity, their hypnotic dance stirs the soul, arouses the imagination and prepares the senses for an uninhibited transformation."
- Magnum
  - "Look out, ladies, 'cuz here comes Magnum. He's an undercover agent, and it's no secret he's on a mission. Who's gonna share that special bond? Is it you? Catch him if you can."
  - "Magnum [Willie Hulett], our very special secret agent, peels away his tough exterior in a sensual mission for the ladies. He tantalizes and teases the audience by revealing his chiseled body bit by bit before showing off his secret weapon."
- Perfect Jam
  - "Let me entice you to unlock and unleash your inner diva."
  - "Gorgeous, and powerful, the dancers [Tiffany de Alba, Anouck Margueritte, Briana McKee, Marie Ndutiye, Kaitlyn Reese Davin, Leah Sykes-Hodgson, Monteece Taylor, Arnaud Boursain, Pepe Muñoz Martinez] invade the space to express and celebrate their female and male energy and unleash their inner diva. Turning up the heat, they ignite the stage performing a sultry and dynamic dance that will entice the imagination."
- Aerial Dream (also called M&M)
  - "Is there someone in your life that you lust for, long for, but the only safe place to rendezvous is in your dreams? You fall asleep and hope he's there again tonight. The best part? Nobody needs to know, not even the person right next to you, shhh..."
  - "One woman and one man [Marina Tomanova and Michael McNamara]. One bed. One airborne fantasy. She dreams about him, the intense secret object of her desires. They will meet and experience a magnificent, sensual and passionate performance. Dream or reality?"
- 2Men
  - "2 men in a cage [Arnaud Boursain, Pepe Muñoz Martinez]. Through their fierce choreography, a passionate story of impossible love and anger unfolds. Again and again, they attract and repel in intense conflict until the magnetic energy between them becomes more than they can bear."
    - As previously stated, the big thing that changed about this act was that the men danced in bright red heels and in an entirely new form of dance.
    - This was eventually changed into a wushu (sport) act with ninjas [Philip Sahagun and Wes Scarpias].
- Tissus 2.0
  - "Though he desperately tries to catch her attention, Alan [Jones Silva] remains unnoticed by Mariko [Muranaka], the musical muse whose beauty propels him to soar to new heights. Finally, the once-unattainable object of his affection is within arms’ reach, and their two worlds come together at the finale of this mesmerizing aerial dance."
- Body2Body 2.0
  - Used as a back-up for hand-2-hand, Stéphan Choinière returned to the show in 2017 and performed a new version of Body2Body with Tsvetelina Tabakova.
- Solo Strap
  - A solo strap back-up act that was performed by Tsvetelina Tabakova from 2019 onwards.
- Light
  - A comedic act with Dick and Izzy as they rave on the stage with one of the audience members.
- Trapeze
  - Halfway around the world, his loved one is away. It's raining, and descending in his thoughts are the warmth of her love, the softness of her lips, the caress of her touch... It’s late, he’s restless and alone again tonight, and not knowing when they’ll be together again sends his emotions flying."
  - Arthur Morel van Hyfte's act in 2017. This used the bed and music from Aerial Dream and replaced the act for awhile.

== Emcees ==
- Main emcees
  - Mistress of Seduction, Joey Arias: August 14, 2003 to December 31, 2007
  - Raven O: August 14, 2003 to December 31, 2006
  - Mistress of Sensuality, Edie [Christopher Kenney]: Jan 1, 2008 to March 14, 2020
- Understudy emcees
  - Queen of Québec, Vanessa Convery: back-up for an unknown time, but she was in the show from August 14, 2003 to January 3, 2014
  - Señorita Extravaganza, Antonio Drija: back-up for an unknown time, but he was in the show from August 14, 2003 to January 3, 2014
  - AXLE Beaurouge [Brandon Pereyda]: May 1, 2017 to March 14, 2020
  - Pepe Muñoz Martinez: roughly 2014 to 2016
  - Pulga, Alan Jones Silva: July 18, 2016 to March 14, 2020
- Guest emcee
- NeNe Leakes: June 27, 2014 to July 01, 2014

== Characters ==
- Mistress of Seduction/Mitzi la Bouche/Mitzi la Gaine/Mistress of Ceremonies - Joey Arias
- Mistress of Sensuality, Edie - Christopher Kenney
- Pulga - Alan Jones Silva as emcee
- AXLE Beaurouge - Brandon Pereyda as emcee
- Queen of Québec - Vanessa Convery as emcee
- Señorita Extravaganza - Antonio Drija as emcee
- Wind/La Muerte - Marcela de la Vega Luna
- Dick and Izzy/The Sexperts - Nicky Dewhurst and Shannan Calcutt
- Afrique/African Queen - Wassa Coulibaly
- Ginger - Shereen Hickman as clown understudy to Izzy
- Jane - clown understudy to Izzy
- Jessica - Laetitia Dewhurst as clown understudy to Izzy
- Rose Boy - Alex Castro
- Spider Shadow - Dima "Shine" Bulkin
- Magnum - Willie Hulett
- Blue Robotica - Mariko Muranaka
- Biker - Brandon Pereyda
- Fauna - Jesus Villa
- Athon and Arno Extravaganza/The Gods of Love and War - Patrick King (Athon) and Johan King-Silverhult (Arno)
- Molinier (see Pierre Molinier) - Jonel Earl
- Botero Sisters - Licemar and Luciene Medeiros
- Casanova/Gigolo/El Siete - Antonio Drija
- Miss Salsa - Agnès Roux
- Mec Branché - Ugo Mazin
- Mademoiselle Loup/Blue Blade - Laurence Jardin
- Dominatrix - Jonel Earl
- Ballerine - Sophie Ayache
- Comet - Stéphan Choinière (originally called Ultraman during creation, after the Japanese super hero)
- Romantique/Vixen Vanessa/Diamond Girl - Vanessa Convery
- Scottish Fantasy - Alex Stabler
- Tissu Star - Olga Vershinina
- Airman - Nicolas Alain Michel Besnard
- Androgynous Cape - "Almukatab" Jacobo Espina
- Carol/La Catin - Elena Gatilova
- Valentino
- Bunny Girl
- Lothario - Moukhtar Gusengadzhiev
- Roadrunner - Jerónimo Garcia-Cabral Medina
- Illusia and Illaria
- Queen of Barbare

== Music ==
The studio album for Zumanity was released on March 22, 2005, under Cirque du Soleil's music label. This is an "inspired by" album containing music that was not actually used in the show and was very loosely based on the live music. This is similar to the songs If I Could Reach Your Heart, We've Been Waiting So Long, and Reach for Me Now on the KÀ album. The CD does not feature Zumanity's musicians, although it does contain the voice of Joey Arias and that of Anna Liani, who worked with Zumanity's composer, Simon Carpentier, on the show's music and wrote the lyrics to Mio Bello, Bello Amore. She also sings Mio Bello, Bello Amore on Cirque's Midnight Sun DVD. The music on the album is mainly a collaboration between Simon Carpentier, Robbi Finkel, and Robbie Dillon.

A promotional album entitled Foreplay was included with the original program. It was released on July 31, 2003, and contains select work-in-progress songs from the show's creation period. The program was last sold around 2005, and this album is now considered a collector's item. Four other work-in-progress songs were released on Zumanity's website in 2003, all completely different from anything used in the show, although one of them was quite clearly an early version of Wind.

2003 Foreplay album

1. The Opener

- Based on the title of this song, this was probably meant to be used during Animation (the opening of the show).

2. Major-Minor - featuring Joey Arias

- A different rendition of this song was used for Welcome from August 14, 2003 to December 31, 2007.

3. The Rose Boy

- A different, more upbeat version of this song was used for the Rose Boy.

4. My Erotic Lounge - featuring Joey Arias

- A different rendition of this song was used for Izzy's Scotch Baggies! act. Dick and Izzy joined the show in 2005.

2005 studio album

1. Mio Bello, Bello Amore - featuring Anna Liani

- A different rendition of this song was used originally for the Pacemakers act and then later for various other acts over the years, especially Dima "Shine" Bulkin's Handbalancing act.

2. Entrée

- This song was not used in the show.

3. En Zum - featuring Dutch Robinson & the Montreal Intercultural Choir

- Inspired by Tissus.

4. Wind - featuring Joey Arias

- Inspired by Wind, and the opening monologue is similar to the one used in the show.

5. Another Man - featuring Sylvie Desgroseillers

- Inspired by Dance on TV.

6. First Taste - featuring Joey Arias

- This is the opening monologue for Water Bowl.

7. Do It Again - featuring Dutch Robinson

- Two possibilities for the act that inspired this song are Body2Body, as the words "do it again" are part of the Sex Is Beautiful song, and Water Bowl as the theme of the song is similar to the theme of Water Bowl's monologue about first experiences. However, the song itself sounds unlike any of the music in the show. This and Fugare are also the two songs on the album that Simon Carpentier did not collaborate on.

8. Water Bowl (Awakening) - featuring Sarah Océane

- Inspired by Water Bowl and the poetry is unique to the album.

9. The Good Thing - featuring Nadine Benny

- Inspired by the Rose Boy.

10. Tickle Tango

- The beginning of the song is inspired by Dislocation.

11. Into Me - featuring Sylvie Desgroseillers and Dutch Robinson

- Inspired by the Hoop act's Libera me. This song was later placed in the show for the Chains act.

12. Fugare

- May be inspired by Body2Body's opening song.

13. Meditation - featuring René Bazinet, who played Jesko in Cirque's Saltimbanco and performed the monologue for the show's Rideau song

- Inspired by Body2Body and the poetry is unique to the album.

14. Piece of Heaven - featuring Coco Thompson

- Inspired by Body2Body's Sex Is Beautiful.

15. Zum Astra - featuring Shock-T

- Inspired by the Market interlude.

16. Mangora En Zum

- Inspired by Tissus.

17. Per Sempre - Stephend

- Inspired by Pacemaker's Mio Bello, Bello Amore.

18. Bello Amore - Ginette Reno

- Inspired by Pacemaker's Mio Bello, Bello Amore.

Names for live music:

- Zumanity Tango (2Men, 2003-2020)
- Sex Is Beautiful (Body2Body, 2003-2005; Body2Body 2.0, 2017-2020; Hand-2-Hand, 2005-2020)
- Love Myself (possible name for Straps, 2003-2020)
- Girl Attitude (Cyr Wheel, ?-2018)
- Libera me (Hoops, 2003-2015; Aerial Dream, 2015-2020; Trapeze, 2017)
  - The tune to this song was changed from 2015 onwards.
- I Like It (Rotational act sung by Joey Arias and possibly Raven O, 2005(?)-2007)
- What a Feelin’ (Act sung by Joey Arias during her final performance on December 31, 2007)
- The Rose Boy (Rose Boy, 2003-2015; Magnum, 2015-2020)
- My Erotic Lounge (Scotch Baggies!, 2005-2020)
- Major-Minor (Welcome, 2003-2007)
- Wind (Wind, 2003-2015; Come Together, 2015-2020)
- Mio Bello, Bello Amore (Pacemakers, 2003-2006(?); Handbalancing, 2010-2018; Solo Strap, 2019-2020)
- Disco Alan (Tissus 2.0, 2015-2020)
  - The opening of this song contains an instrumental medley of Wind and Mio Bello, Bello Amore.
- Into Me (Chains, 2012(?)-2020)
- Water Bowl (Water Bowl, 2003-2020)
- Perfect Jam (Perfect Jam, 2015-2020)
- First Taste (Water Bowl opening, 2003-2020)

== Vocalists ==
- Emcee
  - See the Emcee section above for a list of the hosts of the show. The emcee sang Major-Minor for Welcome, Midnight Bath, Sex Is Beautiful, the Rose Boy, and I Like It from August 14, 2003 to December 31, 2007. From 2008 onwards, the emcee only sang during the Rose Boy and Sex Is Beautiful. The songs sung by the emcee are mainly in the jazz/cabaret genre.
- Hip Hop Singer
  - Kinnie Starr: August 14, 2003 to September 2003
    - Little is known about this period in Zumanity's history, but Kinnie may have sung some of the rock singer's songs for acts like Dance on TV and Water Bowl.
- R&B/Soul Singer
  - Lonnie Gordon: August 13, 2003 to December 31, 2006
  - Debbie "Divine" Davis: January 2007 to December 31, 2007
  - Paris Red: January 1, 2008 to March 14, 2020
  - Cassiopée: August 2017 to December 2017
    - Cassiopée also sang as a back-up for both the R&B and rock roles, depending on which one was needed, during 2016 to 2020.
- Rock Singer
  - Corinne Zarzour: October 3, 2003 to January 2004; September 2004 to March 14, 2020
  - Nathalie Noël: January 2004 to September 2004
  - Laur Fugère: 2004; 2006
- Backing Singer
  - Geneviève Dubé: August 14, 2003 to March 14, 2020
  - Melle Vasquez: August 14, 2003 to March 14, 2020
  - Anne Charbonneau: August 14, 2003 to December 2008

== Original Musicians ==
- Anne Charbonneau (bandleader/accordion/keyboards/keyboard programming) - August 14, 2003 to December 2008
- Jean-François "Djeff" Houle (assistant bandleader/bass/programming/laptop fx) - August 14, 2003 to 2006(?)
- Jean-François Blais (clarinet/flute/soprano and tenor saxophone/percussion) - August 14, 2003 to March 14, 2020
- Jean-François Thibeault (trombone/percussion) - August 14, 2003 to June 2009
- Larry Aberman (drums/percussion/programming) - August 14, 2003 to August 10, 2019
- Melle Vasquez (guitar/percussion/banjo) - August 14, 2003 to March 14, 2020
- Geneviève Dubé (vibraphone/violin) - August 14, 2003 to March 14, 2020
- Eliot Douglass (piano) - August 14, 2003 to October 31, 2019
- Lonnie Gordon (percussion) - August 14, 2003 to December 31, 2006
- Sébastien Jean (flügelhorn/trumpet) - August 14, 2003 to October 31, 2019

== Critical reception ==
When the show originally premiered in Las Vegas in 2003 Variety wrote, "The show has had its share of growing pains and still has a ways to go before it can stand beside its local previous hits “Mystère” and “O.”"

In 2018, the Las Vegas Sun said, "The current version of “Zumanity” feels warm and inclusive and still outrageously sexy, spiked with unexpected thrills among the beautiful allure."
