= Damien McCrystal =

Damien McCrystal (born 23 March 1961) became the first City editor of The Sun, News International’s daily tabloid, in September 1987 after Robert Worcester, the founder of Market & Opinion Research International (MORI, now Ipsos MORI) told Rupert Murdoch, the owner of News International, that the wave of utility company privatisations in the UK had turned one-quarter of The Sun’s readers into share-owners.

At the time The Sun was selling approximately 4.2 million copies a day, with the highest circulation of any daily English language newspaper in the world. It was generally reckoned by News International and its advertisers, in those days, that each copy was read by up to three people. This translated, according to Worcester’s calculations, into three million share-owning Sun readers. As a direct result, Murdoch ordered The Sun’s editor Kelvin MacKenzie to launch a page dedicated to business news and McCrystal was hired as its editor from another News International title, Today, where he was assistant City editor.

McCrystal used the new platform to campaign for the resignation of Sir Nicholas Goodison, the chairman of London's Stock Exchange (1976–1988), claiming that he had failed adequately to prepare the Exchange for de-regulation (the so-called Big Bang of 1986) or the government's privatisation programme. McCrystal's campaign employed scantily dressed young models in the City of London distributing badges and tee-shirts bearing the legend "The Sun Says Goodison must Go". Goodison retired the following year. After falling out with MacKenzie, McCrystal left The Sun in May 1988. The Sun has maintained its City page ever since, in largely similar format.

After leaving the Sun, McCrystal went on to work as a freelance broadcaster for a time, writing bulletins and occasionally presenting features for TV-am and presenting programmes for Channel 4’s Hard News series, before joining The Daily Telegraph in 1991 as editor of the City Diary in the newspaper’s business pages.

At The Daily Telegraph, he was briefly caught up in the so-called Dirty Tricks dispute between British Airways and Virgin Atlantic when his attempts to investigate a story highlighted the intensity of the two sides' claims and counter-claims. Virgin's then head of corporate communications, Will Whitehorn, has been a friend of McCrystal for 30 years.

In 1996, he became the Director of Corporate Communications at Union Bank of Switzerland's investment banking arm in London and a year later left to join Lanica Trust, an investment vehicle run by the entrepreneur Andrew Regan, who was attempting to win control of the Co-operative Wholesale Society (now the Co-operative Group) in a bitter and hotly contested takeover bid.

When the Co-op bid failed, McCrystal went back into journalism and in December 1997 became a founding staff member of Sunday Business in its second incarnation, under editor Jeff Randall. There he wrote the Diary and a rather louche restaurant review which gained a following amongst City readers for whom the long lunch had largely become a thing of the past. At the same time, he began contributing to The Spectator magazine.

Since 2005 he has been working primarily as a media and PR consultant.

In February 2010, Horlick settled a legal dispute with McCrystal, withdrawing a controversial "super-injunction" and apologising to him. The following statement was jointly issued by Horlick's and McCrystal's respective London solicitors, Schillings and Taylor Wessing:

"In May 2009 after receiving false information from a third party, Nicola Horlick obtained an injunction and launched an action for damages against Damien McCrystal relating to matters of a private nature. Nicola Horlick has now discontinued proceedings against Damien McCrystal and is happy to accept that he did not and would not divulge any personal information and was not at fault. Nicola Horlick is sorry for this misunderstanding, as is reflected in the terms of the agreed costs settlement, which nonetheless remain confidential. The parties have no further comment to make on this matter."

In 2008 McCrystal founded a “green” shareholder pressure group, Environmental Investor Services, which lobbies companies and industries to improve their environmental performance.
