= Tom Rubython =

British author and publisher (born 1955)

Thomas Anthony John Rubython (born 22 August 1955) is a British author and publisher with an interest in business and motor racing.

== Career ==
Rubython was the founder and publisher of Marketeer (weekly), Amusement Business (monthly), LeisureWeek (weekly), BusinessAge (monthly), Sunday Business (weekly), EuroBusiness (monthly), Formula 1 Magazine (monthly), BusinessF1 Magazine (monthly), and SportsPro (monthly). He wrote nine books, biographies of Ayrton Senna (racing driver), Tony O'Reilly (businessman), James Hunt (racing driver), Richard Burton (actor), Jesse Livermore (financier), and Barry White (singer) and two non-fiction motor racing books, one called In The Name of Glory, and the other named Fatal Weekend. His book Shunt was the basis for Ron Howard's film Rush. He also published many yearbooks and annuals including the Leisure Industry Yearbook, the Offshore Finance Annual, the Formula One Annual, and the Formula One Black Book. In 2020, Rubython relaunched BusinessF1 Magazine.

== Libel suits ==
Rubython has interviewed many famous figures over the years from Donald Trump to Tony Blair. He enjoyed a controversial journalistic career and was reputedly sued for libel more times than any other British journalist including lawsuits from figures such as Sir Alan Sugar, Tony Ryan, George Walker, Max Mosley, Bernie Ecclestone, Ken Bates, and Kelvin Mackenzie. Most of the lawsuits were later settled, although he lost one to Tony Purnell, and he won against Richard Woods.

== Politics ==
In 2012, Rubython briefly dabbled in politics and stood for the UK Independence Party in Northampton North at the 2015 United Kingdom general election, receiving 6,354 votes (16%).

== Personal life ==
Rubython was a bachelor until in 2013, at the age of 58, he married his girlfriend of two years, Beverley. He was one of the first people in the UK to clone a dog after his beloved cocker spaniel, Daisy, died in 2016. He hid the fact from his wife until the two new spaniels, cloned from Daisy, arrived at Heathrow from Seoul in 2017.

He has a son called Marcus whom one of his businesses was named after, Marcus publishing.
