= Kevin McCrystal =

Gaelic football manager

Sport
Inter-county management
- Years: Team
- 2002–2003 2020–: Tyrone; Tyrone

Kevin McCrystal is a Gaelic football manager who led the Tyrone ladies' Gaelic football team between 2002 and 2003 and returned to the role in December 2020 after the departure of Gerry Moane.

Bfefore his return he spent one season with the Castlederg St Eugene's club, three seasons as a development officer and also won an All-Ireland Under-14 Championship.
