= Jeff Randall (journalist) =

British journalist

- Born: Jeff William Randall; 3 October 1954 (age 71)
- Occupations: Journalist, presenter
- Notable credit(s): The Sunday Times; BBC; The Daily Telegraph; Sky News
- Title: Business Editor of BBC News (2001–2005)
- Children: 1

Jeff William Randall (born 3 October 1954) is an English former business journalist and presenter, who presented Jeff Randall Live, a business and politics show on Sky News, until stepping down from his role in March 2014. He was a columnist for The Daily Telegraph, and was the first business editor at BBC News.

== Early life ==
Randall was educated at what was then a traditional boys' grammar school, the Royal Liberty School in Romford, Essex, and at the University of Nottingham, graduating with a degree in economics. He started but did not finish postgraduate work in journalism at the University of Florida.

== Career ==
=== Journalism ===
Randall worked as Assistant Editor of Financial Weekly, then between 1986 and 1988 as City correspondent for the Sunday Telegraph. From 1989 to 1994 he was City editor of The Sunday Times, becoming City and Business Editor 1994–95, as well as a Director of Times Newspapers. He was also a director of a City PR firm. He then became assistant editor and sports editor of the Sunday Times. Randall became the editor of the re-launched Sunday Business newspaper in 1998.

=== BBC ===
Randall moved to the BBC in 2001, as the corporation's first business editor. He appeared regularly on the BBC News at Ten, the Today programme and BBC News 24. In addition, he presented Weekend Business, a radio show for BBC Radio 5 Live. He resigned as BBC business editor in late 2005 to join the Daily Telegraph as 'editor-at-large'.

He was replaced as BBC business editor by Robert Peston, formerly associate editor at the Telegraph. Randall has continued to work on BBC projects, including a documentary series on the city and financial turmoil for Radio Four. In addition, he has made television documentaries for ITV, and was the presenter of Jeff Randall Live on Sky News.

Randall has criticised the BBC for being biased and left wing. He noted an occasion when he wore Union Jack cufflinks and a producer told him he could not wear them on air as it would be seen as an endorsement for the National Front. Randall also told of an occasion where he complained to a senior news executive about the BBC's pro-multicultural stance. In a reply he was told "The BBC is not neutral in multiculturalism: it believes in it and it promotes it". He further criticised the bias of the BBC, stating that working at the BBC was "bit like walking into a Sunday meeting of the Flat Earth Society. As they discuss great issues of the day, they discuss them from the point of view that the earth is flat. If someone says, 'No, no, no, the earth is round!', they think this person is an extremist."

=== Jeff Randall Live ===
While working as the Daily Telegraph's editor-at-large, Randall began broadcasting for Sky News in September 2007, presenting the business show Jeff Randall Live. The programme began on a weekly basis, airing on Monday evenings at 19:30, but in January 2009 he joined the channel on a permanent basis and the programme was aired Mondays to Thursdays at 19:00. At that time the world was experiencing an economic downturn, and in a trailer for the show, Randall claimed that the downturn was like nothing he had seen in 25 years of business journalism, and ends with the line "What would I do if I were in government? I'd resign!"

In early 2010, Jeff Randall Live moved to a custom-built studio in the City of London in the building called The Gherkin, where the show continued to be broadcast four nights a week. In February 2014, it was announced that Randall was to leave Sky News to be replaced by The Times's business and city editor Ian King. Randall presented his last show for Sky News on Thursday 27 March 2014.

=== Other activities ===
Randall is a visiting fellow at Oxford University's business school, and has been awarded honorary doctorates of letters by Anglia Ruskin University (2001), the University of Nottingham (2006) and BPP University College (2011). He is also the twenty-ninth member of the University of Nottingham College of Benefactors, into which he was inducted in July 2010. He is an honorary professor at Nottingham University's Business School.

Since April 2014, when he retired from journalism, he has been a non-executive director of Babcock International, where he chairs the remuneration committee, and a director of Sandown Park Racecourse. In July 2017 he became an independent non-executive at BDO, the accountancy firm. In 2023, he became non-executive chairman of Woburn Partners, a London-based communications company.

== Opinions ==
Writing for The Daily Telegraph at the time of the 2005 Conservative Party leadership election, Randall said he would not trust David Cameron "with my daughter's pocket money. [...] To describe Cameron's approach to corporate PR as unhelpful and evasive overstates by a widish margin the clarity and plain-speaking that he brought to the job of being Michael Green's mouthpiece. [...] In my experience, Cameron never gave a straight answer when dissemblance was a plausible alternative, which probably makes him perfectly suited for the role he now seeks: the next Tony Blair."

In August 2007, he launched an attack in the Daily Telegraph on the Labour government, claiming that "the United Kingdom's authority as a sovereign nation has been greatly eroded, our democratic traditions trashed, and the make-up of our society put through the mangle of enforced multiculturalism – all without anything so vulgar as a plebiscite. Like geese being prepared for the production of foie gras, we are having stuffed down our throats that which we do not wish to swallow: the rough corn of Labour's determination to make its changes irreversible. If we dare to complain, we're told that it's good for us."

== Personal life ==
Randall is a supporter of the Glasgow football club, Rangers, which he once described as "the quintessential British club". while his other interests include horseracing and golf.

Randall has lived in Brentwood, Essex since 1984 with his wife. He has a daughter who was born in 1989.

Media offices
Preceded by Position established	Business Editor of BBC News; 2001–2005	Succeeded by Robert Peston
