= The Sunday Telegraph =

British broadsheet newspaper

- Type: Weekly newspaper
- Format: Broadsheet
- Owner(s): Telegraph Media Group (Axel Springer SE)
- Editor: Allister Heath
- Founded: 5 February 1961; 65 years ago
- Political alignment: Conservative
- Headquarters: 111 Buckingham Palace Road, London, SW1W 0DT
- Circulation: 248,288 (as of December 2019)
- Sister newspapers: The Daily Telegraph
- ISSN: 0307-269X
- OCLC number: 436617202
- Website: telegraph.co.uk

The Sunday Telegraph is a British broadsheet conservative newspaper, first published on 5 February 1961 by the Telegraph Media Group. It is the sister paper of The Daily Telegraph, also published by the Telegraph Media Group. The Sunday Telegraph was originally a separate operation with different editorial staff, but since 2013 the Telegraph has been a seven-day operation. However, The Sunday Telegraph still has its own editor, different from that of The Daily Telegraph.

When the Sunday Telegraph was launched in February 1961 by William Micheal Berry, it was the first new national Sunday newspaper to launch for over 40 years. Another member of the Berry family owned The Sunday Times and there had been an agreement that no Sunday edition of The Telegraph would be created. When Viscount Kemsley sold The Sunday Times in 1959, William Berry decided to launch the paper. The newspaper distinguished itself from other titles by containing more news than was typical.

In 1994, they became one of the first traditional UK newspapers to launch online when the Electronic Telegraph website went live. The Electronic Telegraph was part of a brand repositioning strategy for The Telegraph and The Sunday Telegraph, to help the titles appeal to younger affluent readers.

The Sunday Telegraph operated independently from The Telegraph until 2013, when the newspapers became a single operation, the result of changes made due to commercial pressures, the impact of the internet on the newspaper industry and a reduction in advertising rates.

Since 2020, The Telegraph and The Sunday Telegraph have chosen to keep their Audit Bureau of Circulations (ABC) readership numbers private, with the last known figures for The Sunday Telegraph being 248,288 (December 2019). YouGov surveys have shown that 91% of people know about The Sunday Telegraph and 31% of people have a positive opinion about the newspaper (although it is disliked by 25% of people asked).

In March 2026, it was announced that Axel Springer SE had agreed to purchase the Telegraph Media Group for £575 million (including The Sunday Telegraph), after the groups ownership had been in limbo since 2023.
