= Freddie Fletcher =

English actor (born 1950)

Freddie Fletcher (born 1950) is an English actor best known for playing Jud, in Ken Loach's 1969 film Kes. He also appeared in the ITV series Fox.

== Early years ==
Fletcher was born in Grimethorpe, West Riding of Yorkshire, and attended Willowgarth Secondary School. He later said, "The only acting I did was in the headmaster's office". When he left school he worked as a painter and decorator for a large firm, until Ken Loach cast him as Jud Casper, the violent brother of Billy Casper in Kes released in 1969.

== Career after Kes ==
Like many of the actors in Kes, Fletcher had no formal acting experience, but almost immediately found television work after the film was released and commended by the critics.

Fletcher had a regular television role as layabout Raymond Shepherd, one of Diana Dors's wayward sons in the comedy series Queenie's Castle. The show was first broadcast on Bonfire Night in 1970 and ran for two years.

Shortly before Queenie's Castle came to an end in September 1972, in the January of that year he was seen as a football team captain in Jack Rosenthal's drama Another Sunday and Sweet F.A., which was part of Granada Television's Sunday Night Theatre series.

For the rest of the 1970s, Fletcher appeared in television plays, including four BBC Play for Today episodes between 1973 and 1978. He also made another successful movie, playing one of the ship's radio officers in the British thriller Juggernaut in 1974, starring Richard Harris and Anthony Hopkins.

In 1978, he appeared in the ITV movie Clouds of Glory, starring Felicity Kendal, written by Melvyn Bragg and directed by Ken Russell.

In November 1982, Fletcher played Chalkie Whitely's son Bob in two episodes of the ITV soap opera Coronation Street. By this time, actress Lynne Perrie was established in the show as Ivy Tilsley. Perrie had played Fletcher's mother in Kes and had worked alongside him in Queenie's Castle ten years before. Consequently, Fletcher had acted alongside Perrie's brother Duggie Brown in Another Sunday and Sweet F.A.

In December 1980, Fletcher appeared in four episodes of Emmerdale Farm as law breaking Derek Warner. He later reprised the role in 1984 for a further four episodes. When the character reappeared again in 1985, he was re-cast and actor Dennis Blanch took on the part until 1986.

In 1988 he was seen as menacing retired boxer Bob Derrick in 'Only One Woof' - an episode from All Creatures Great and Small.

In the 1990s, Fletcher continued to act regularly on television and in film. He had a regular role as Mr. Smithson in the ITV drama series Children's Ward. He also appeared as farmer Sam Carver in the "Bitter Harvest" episode of Heartbeat in 1992, and played George Milton in the "Tender" episode of Peak Practice in 1995. The same year he co-starred with Jane Horrocks, Ray Stevenson and Gwen Taylor in Some Kind of Life.

In 1996, Fletcher played a minor part in the BBC film Brothers in Trouble. That same year he was briefly seen as Judd, a pub landlord in the movie When Saturday Comes by Maria Giese. The film starred Sean Bean who recommended him for the part, and it remains Fletcher's last acting role to date.

== Personal life ==
Fletcher lives in Grimethorpe and is married to Joy, who was Willowgarth School's non-teaching Head of Year. He has 3 sons: Adam, Dean, and Joe.

== Selected TV and filmography ==
- Kes (1969)
- Queenie's Castle (TV 1970–1972)
- Another Sunday and Sweet F.A. (TV 1972)
- Juggernaut (1974)
- Crown Court (TV 1976/1978)
- Clouds of Glory (TV 1978)
- Emmerdale Farm (TV 1980/1984)
- Coronation Street (TV 1982)
- Albion Market (TV 1986)
- Floodtide (TV 1987)
- The Nature of the Beast (1988)
- All Creatures Great and Small (TV 1988)
- BBH (TV 1990)
- Children's Ward (TV 1990–1991)
- Heartbeat (TV 1993)
- Peak Practice (TV 1995)
- The Governor (TV 1995)
- Brothers in Trouble (1995)
- Some Kind of Life (TV 1995)
- When Saturday Comes (1996)
