= Don Black (lyricist) =

English lyricist (born 1938)

Don Black CBE
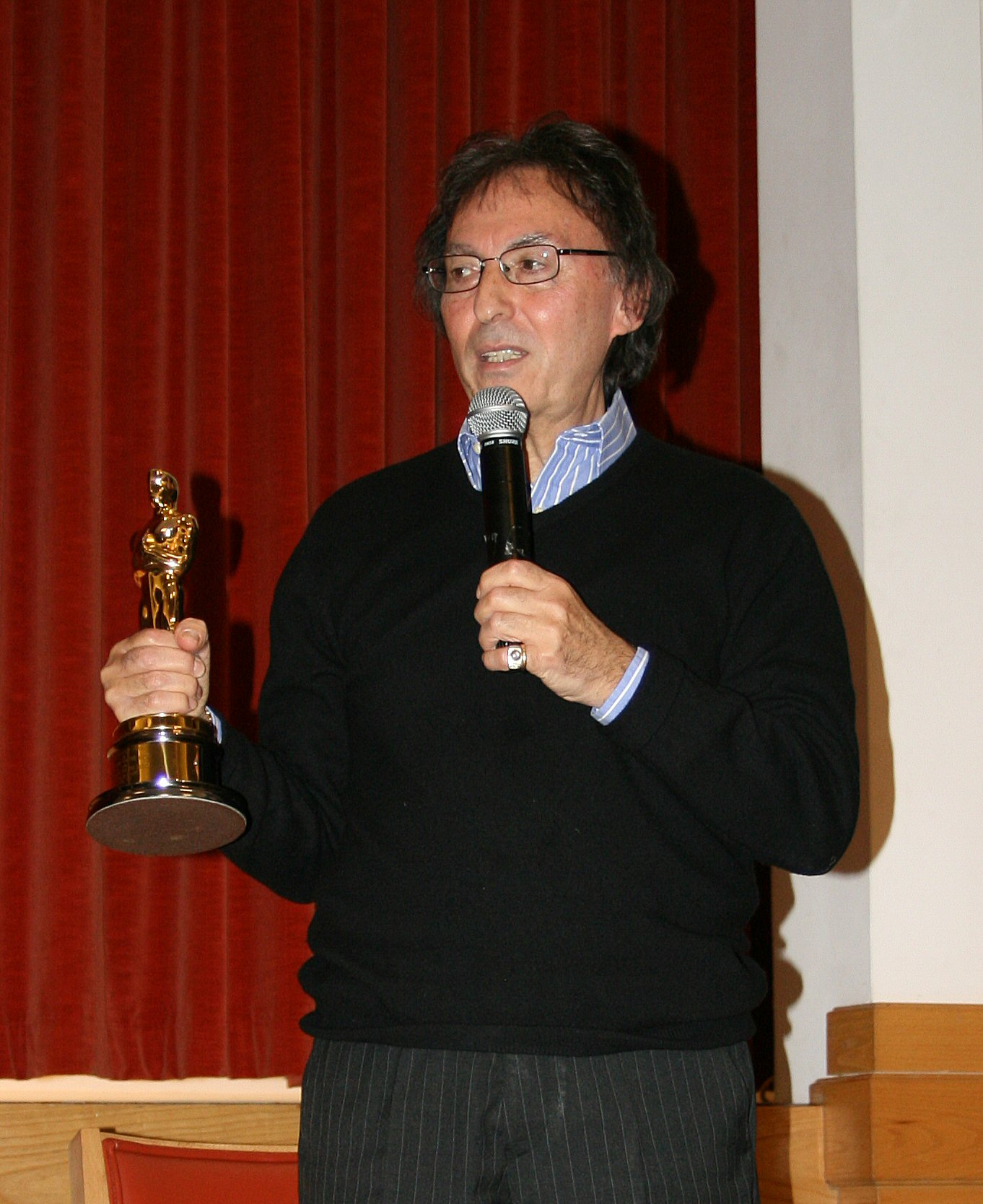
- Don Black shows his Oscar for "Born Free" at Nightingale House in February 2010

Background information
- Born: Donald Blackstone; 21 June 1938 (age 88); South Hackney, London, England
- Genre: Popular music
- Occupations: Songwriter; lyricist
- Years active: 1960s–present
- Website: donblack.co.uk

Donald Blackstone (born 21 June 1938), known professionally as Don Black, is an English lyricist. His works have included numerous musicals, movie, television themes and hit songs. He has provided lyrics for John Barry, Charles Strouse, Matt Monro, Andrew Lloyd Webber, Quincy Jones, Hoyt Curtin, Lulu, Jule Styne, Henry Mancini, Meat Loaf, Michael Jackson, Robbie Williams, Elmer Bernstein, Michel Legrand, Hayley Westenra, Ennio Morricone, A. R. Rahman, Marvin Hamlisch and Debbie Wiseman.

AllMusic stated that "Black is perhaps best-known for his collaborations with Andrew Lloyd Webber, and for the James Bond theme songs he co-wrote with composer John Barry: Thunderball, Diamonds Are Forever and The Man with the Golden Gun."

== Early life ==
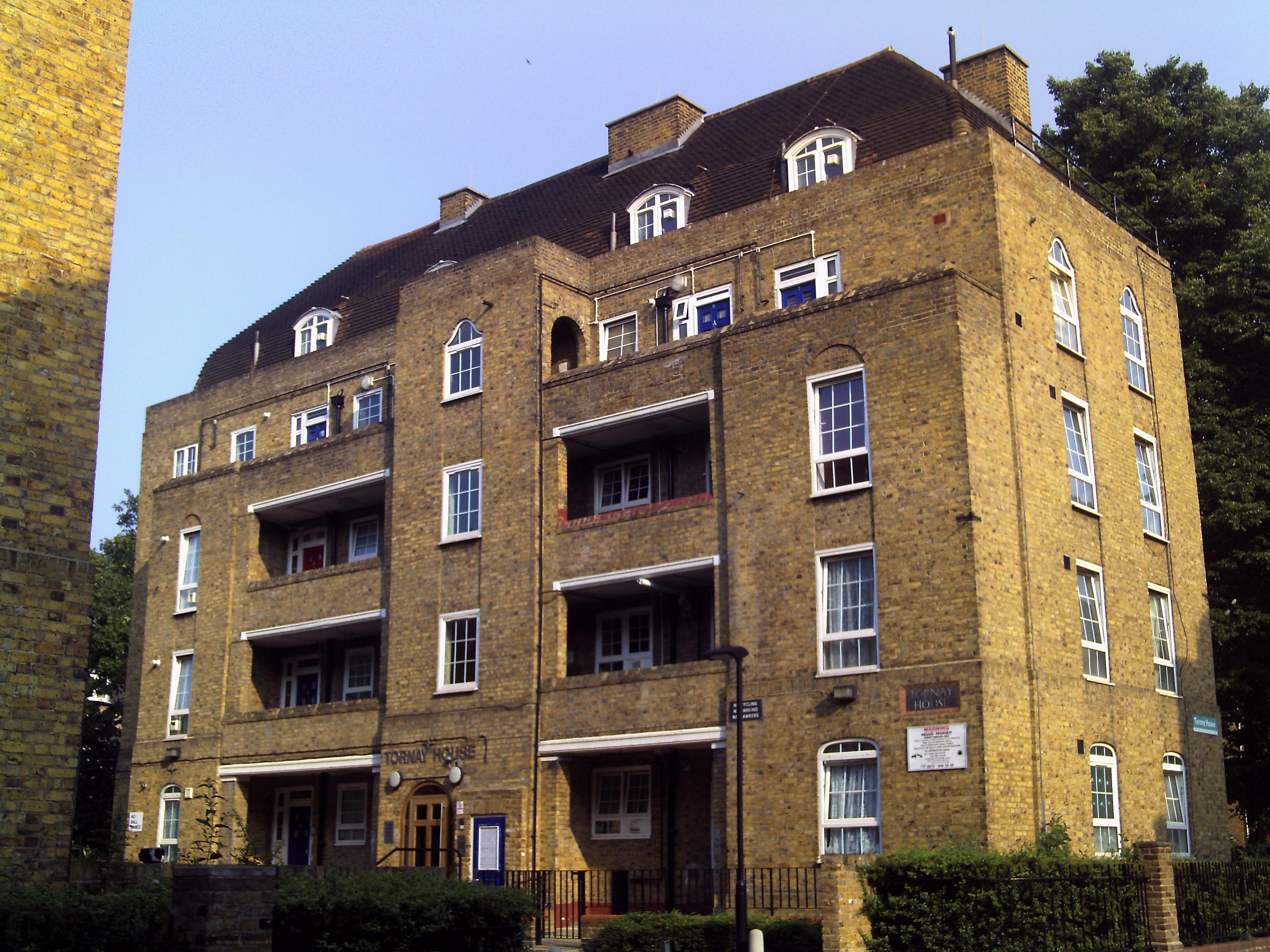
Tornay House, Shore Place, London E9, which includes the childhood home of Don Black

He was born Donald Blackstone in London, the youngest of five children of Russian Jewish immigrants from Ukraine, Morris and Betsy (née Kersh) Blackstone. His father worked as a garment presser and his mother in a clothes shop and during his childhood the family lived in a council flat in Tornay House, Shore Place, South Hackney. He attended Cassland Road School and enjoyed visits to the Hackney Empire, which was then a music hall and to the cinema to watch James Cagney films.

== Career ==
=== Early career ===
He began his music industry career as an office boy with a music publishing firm, and later worked as a song-plugger. He also had a brief spell as a comic.

He was personal manager to the singer Matt Monro for many years and also provided songs for him (usually writing English language lyrics to continental songs). These included "Walk Away" and "If I Never Sing Another Song" (music: Udo Jürgens) and "For Mamma" (music: Charles Aznavour).

=== Film work ===
Black's first film work was the lyrics for the theme of the James Bond feature Thunderball (1965). His association with the Bond series continued over several decades, with Diamonds Are Forever and The Man with the Golden Gun, in collaboration with John Barry; "Surrender" for Tomorrow Never Dies and the title song for The World Is Not Enough, in collaboration with David Arnold.

Black's film work culminated when he collaborated with Barry on the title song of 1966's Born Free, which won the Oscar for Best Song and provided a hit for Matt Monro. Pianist Roger Williams made the US Top 40 with an instrumental version. The song was nominated for Song of the Year at the 1967 Grammy Awards. The movie's producer, Sam Jaffe, was not impressed with the song, fearing that Black had made too much of a political comment in the lyric, and initially had the film printed without it on the soundtrack. When it became a US hit, he relented and had the film reprinted, commenting to Black, "It grows on you," after the song won the Oscar.

Black later collaborated with Barry on The Tamarind Seed, Out of Africa, Dances with Wolves, and an ill-fated Broadway musical, The Little Prince and the Aviator. In 1967, Lulu took the Black-Mark London title song of the film To Sir, with Love to No. 1 on the Billboard Hot 100. Black received his second Oscar nomination for Best Song with the title theme, written with Elmer Bernstein, of the 1969 John Wayne western, True Grit. That same year, he partnered with Quincy Jones for the theme song of the Michael Caine film, The Italian Job, "On Days Like These". He received a third Oscar nomination for the title song of the 1972 film Ben, a US No. 1 hit for Michael Jackson, which Black had written with Walter Scharf. Further Oscar nominations came for "Wherever Love Takes Me" (music: Elmer Bernstein), from 1974 film Gold, and "Come to Me" (music: Henry Mancini) from 1976's The Pink Panther Strikes Again.

In addition, Black teamed with Charles Strouse on the songs "Growing Up Isn't Easy" and "Anything Can Happen on Halloween" for the 1986 HBO film The Worst Witch, based on the children's book by Jill Murphy. Disney commissioned him to write songs for the direct-to-video film Beauty and the Beast: The Enchanted Christmas.

In July 2023, it was announced that Black would collaborate with film composer David Arnold and singer-songwriter Sophie Ellis-Bextor on a song for the Channel 4 and Universal Pictures film, Mog's Christmas, based upon the children's book series by Judith Kerr. The track, titled "As Long As I Belong", is about "the importance of belonging".

=== Musical theatre ===
Black's stage credits include the musicals Billy (music: John Barry), Bar Mitzvah Boy (music: Jule Styne), Dear Anyone (music: Geoff Stephens), Budgie (music: Mort Shuman) and several Andrew Lloyd Webber shows: the 1979 song-cycle, Tell Me on a Sunday, which was performed by Marti Webb (whom Black also managed for a time); Aspects of Love, which propelled Michael Ball to stardom; and, together with Christopher Hampton, the musical adaptation of the Billy Wilder film Sunset Boulevard. The latter brought Black and Hampton a Tony Award for Best Book.

Tell Me on a Sunday was incorporated into Song and Dance. This was later adapted for a Broadway production starring Bernadette Peters, for which she won a Tony award as Best Actress in a Musical. Sarah Brightman performed for a video recording of the show at the end of its West End run and also released "Unexpected Song", from that musical, as a single.

With Geoff Stephens he produced a concept album of a "revuesical" entitled Off The Wall.

In 2002, he worked with the Indian composer A. R. Rahman on the musical Bombay Dreams. In 2004, Black's second musical collaboration with Hampton, Frank Wildhorn's Dracula, the Musical, debuted on Broadway. He also collaborated with John Barry once more, on the musical Brighton Rock. Based on the Graham Greene novel, it debuted at the Almeida Theatre, London, in 2004. In 2006, Black created the lyrics for the musical adaptation of the book Feather Boy, for the National Theatre in London.

In 2011, Black wrote the lyrics alongside composer Frank Wildhorn for the 2011 Broadway production of Bonnie & Clyde, which premiered at the Gerald Schoenfeld Theatre on 22 November 2011 and closed four weeks later due to poor ticket sales, despite the general public giving the show high praise for its score and the lead actors Jeremy Jordan (as Clyde Barrow) and Laura Osnes (as Bonnie Parker). The cast recording, however, became one of Wildhorn and Black's most successful musical scores.

In 2013, he again worked with Christopher Hampton and Andrew Lloyd Webber on Stephen Ward the Musical. In 2015, he wrote the lyrics for Mrs Henderson Presents, with George Fenton and Simon Chamberlin composing the music. In 2019, he collaborated with David Arnold on the music for a television version of The Tiger Who Came to Tea.

In 2020, he was reported to be working on a musical version of The Third Man, and reworking the show Feather Boy.

In 2026, his musical revue From the Heart returns to the West End in October, starring Caroline O’Connor and Clive Rowe.

=== Radio broadcasting ===
Black presented a Sunday night show on BBC Radio 2 from 2013 to 2020, which featured classic songs and songwriters of the 20th century, paid a weekly tribute to Matt Monro, whom he managed, and included many of his showbiz encounter stories. He took over this slot from David Jacobs.

In November 2020 BBC Sounds released The Sanest Guy in the Room: A Life in Lyrics, a podcast series in which Black reflects on his life, songs and working with some of the biggest names in showbiz.

In 2025, Black started broadcasting his programme Our Kind of Music on Boom Radio at weekends.

=== Books ===
In 2003, Sanctuary Publishing released Wrestling with Elephants, an authorised biography of Black, written by James Inverne. In 2020, Black released his own memoir entitled The Sanest Guy in the Room: A Life in Lyrics.

== Honours and recognition ==
In 1990, EMI/Capitol released the compilation Matt Monro Sings Don Black, which was the only album consisting solely of songs co-written by the lyricist until Play It Again released Born Free – The Don Black Songbook in 1993.

In 1996, he was surprised by Michael Aspel as the subject of This is Your Life, which included contributions from collaborators John Barry, Elmer Bernstein and Andrew Lloyd Webber, as well as the performers Tom Jones, Elaine Paige, Marti Webb and Michael Ball.

In 2007, Black was inducted into the Songwriters Hall of Fame. That same year, Black was credited on "Sexy Lady", the 2007 debut single and hit for rapper Yung Berg, which sampled the Black-Barry theme for Diamonds Are Forever.

On 17 August 2008, the tribute concert Lyrics by Don Black was held at the London Palladium, featuring performances of Black's songs by a selection of guest artists. The evening, hosted by Michael Parkinson and recorded for broadcast by BBC Radio 2, included an exclusive performance of two songs from Black's new musical, The Count of Monte Cristo. The concert included contributions from Lee Mead, Gary Barlow, Elkie Brooks, Craig David, Maria Friedman, Joe Longthorne, Lulu, Peter Grant, Raza Jaffrey, Matt Rawle, Ryan Molloy, Marti Webb, Jonathan Ansell, Hayley Westenra, Phil Campbell and Mica Paris. The singers were accompanied by the Royal Philharmonic Orchestra, led by Mike Dixon and with guest conductors Michel Legrand and David Arnold.

In October 2013, a special concert to celebrate Black's work was held at London's Royal Festival Hall, featuring a lengthy interview with the composer by Michael Grade, interspersed by performances of his songs by artists such as Michael Ball, Maria Friedman, Katie Melua, and Marti Webb. The concert was recorded for television and first shown on BBC Four in early January 2014.

Black was appointed Officer of the Order of the British Empire (OBE) in the 1999 Birthday Honours, and promoted to Commander of the Order of the British Empire (CBE) in the 2024 New Year Honours, for services to music.

== Personal life ==
Black lives in London, England. His wife of nearly 60 years, Shirley, died in March 2018. In May 2020, he was treated in hospital for COVID-19.

Black's elder brother, Michael Black, a showbusiness booking agent, was married to singer Julie Rogers until his death in November 2018.

== See also ==
- Songs with lyrics by Don Black

== Musical theatre credits ==
Title	Year	Composer	Book	Co-lyricist
Maybe That's Your Problem	1971	Walter Scharf	Lionel Chetwynd	
Billy	1974	John Barry	Dick Clement and Ian La Frenais	
Bar Mitzvah Boy	1978	Jule Styne	Jack Rosenthal	
Tell Me on a Sunday	1979 (Revised 1985 and 2003)	Andrew Lloyd Webber		Richard Maltby Jr. (1985 version)
Abbacadabra	1983	Benny Andersson and Björn Ulvaeus		
Dear Anyone	1983	Geoff Stephens	Jack Rosenthal	
Merlin	1983	Elmer Bernstein		
The Little Prince and the Aviator	1982	John Barry	Hugh Wheeler	
Budgie	1988	Mort Shuman	Keith Waterhouse and Willis Hall	
Aspects of Love	1989	Andrew Lloyd Webber		Charles Hart
Starlight Express	1993	Andrew Lloyd Webber		Richard Stilgoe (principal lyricist; Black wrote one song)
Radio Times	1992	Noel Gay and Abi Grant		Chris Walker
Sunset Boulevard	1993	Andrew Lloyd Webber		Christopher Hampton; with contributions by Amy Powers
The Goodbye Girl	1997	Marvin Hamlisch	Neil Simon	David Zippel (Black added lyrics for the original British production)
Dracula, the Musical	2001	Frank Wildhorn		Christopher Hampton
Bombay Dreams	2002	AR Rahman	Meera Syal and Thomas Meehan	
Dance of the Vampires	2002	Jim Steinman	Jim Steinman, Michael Kunze and David Ives	Jim Steinman and Michael Kunze (Black contributed additional lyrics)
Whistle Down the Wind	2002	Andrew Lloyd Webber	Patricia Knop	Jim Steinman (Black contributed additional lyrics)
Romeo and Juliet - The Musical	2002			
Feather Boy	2006	Debbie Wiseman		
Bonnie & Clyde	2011	Frank Wildhorn	Ivan Menchell	
Stephen Ward	2013	Andrew Lloyd Webber	Don Black and Christopher Hampton	Christopher Hampton
Mrs Henderson Presents	2015	George Fenton and Simon Chamberlin	Terry Johnson	

== Bibliography ==
- Wrestling with Elephants (The Authorized Biography of Don Black) by James Inverne, Sanctuary Publishing, 2003 ISBN 1860744680
