= Ray Mort =

English actor (1926–1994)

- Born: Joseph Raymond Mort; 10 January 1926; Bury, Lancashire, England
- Died: 4 July 1994 (aged 68); Bury, Lancashire, England
- Occupation: Actor
- Years active: 1950–1989

Joseph Raymond "Ray" Mort (10 January 1926 - 4 July 1994) was an English actor. He was best known for his roles as Ray in the sitcom Oh No It's Selwyn Froggitt, and Ern in the trilogy of television plays for Play for Today that included The Fishing Party (1972), Shakespeare or Bust (1973) and Three for the Fancy (1974). He was best known best known for playing character roles in television and theatre. Active from the early 1950s onwards, he was equally adept at both drama and comedy parts.

== Career ==
Mort began his career working in repertory companies in Yorkshire and Lancashire. In 1950, he joined the Saxon Players, who performed shows at the Theatre Royal, Leicester; in 1954 he departed from the group and moved to London, where he worked in stock with the Theatre Royal Company appearing in Croydon and Chatham. Later in August 1955, he briefly returned to the Saxon Players, appearing in Seagulls Over Sorrento as Badger. In 1956, he joined the newly formed Windsor Players, a repertory company based at The Windsor, Salford. Later the same year he made his television debut appearing in ITV's Play of the Week. In 1957, he was among the original cast members in the Granada sitcom The Army Game. Between December 1960 - January 1961 he appeared as insurance agent Ron Bailey in several early episodes of Coronation Street, he later returned in December 1962, playing Harry Bailey, a near identical character. During the 1960's, he appeared in a number of television shows including Armchair Theatre, Z-Cars, No Hiding Place, Taxi!, The Plane Makers, Dixon of Dock Green, The Wednesday Play, Mogul and Softly Softly. In 1965, he joined the cast of Spring and Port Wine as Arthur, initially shown at The Alexandra, Birmingham, it later transferred to the West End in November 1965, showing at the Mermaid Theatre and subsequently at The Apollo Theatre in January 1966, he stayed with the cast until the end of its Apollo run in July 1967. In 1968, he appeared in the ATV crime-drama series Crime Buster as Jimmy Vine, which ran for a single series.

In 1970, he featured in the Doomwatch episode "The Battery People" as Jones. Later in 1972, he played Ern in The Fishing Party, alongside Brian Glover and Douglas Livingstone, a comedy about three Derbyshire miners who go on a fishing holiday to Whitby, he would subsequently reprise the role in Shakespeare or Bust and Three for the Fancy respectively. In 1975, he featured in It's a Lovely Day Tomorrow as family patriarch John Bell, a docu-drama that charts the events of the Bethnal Green disaster where 173 people were killed in a stampede at Bethnal Green Station on the night of 3 March 1943. The same year, he also appeared in The Evacuees as Louis, a television play written by Jack Rosenthal, a semi autobiographical story about two Jewish boys who are sent to lodge with a non-Jewish family in Blackpool at the beginning of World War Two, which later gained an International Emmy award in fiction and drama. Mort's best known television role was as Ray in the Yorkshire Television sitcom Oh No It's Selwyn Froggitt, where he worked as barman and club steward of the Scarsdale Social Club, he appeared in three series broadcast between 1976-1977. In 1978, he appeared as Mr. Wiggins in an episode of All Creatures Great and Small, he would go onto reprise the same role a decade later.

Mort has featured in a number of supporting roles in a number of comedy series, including The Good Life, The Cuckoo Waltz, The Other 'Arf, Give Us a Break, Only Fools and Horses, Hallelujah! and Duty Free. He has also appeared in a number of drama series including Owen M.D., Follyfoot, Shabby Tiger, South Riding, Churchill's People, The Sweeney, Esther Walters, Survivors, The XYY Man, All Creatures Great and Small, Crown Court, Dick Turpin, Juliet Bravo, When the Boat Comes In, The Chinese Detective, Bergerac, The Good Companions, Lytton's Diary, Casualty and The Bill.

In 1980, he played George Willis in the Play for Today film Thicker Than Water about a group of black pudding makers who compete in the annual Foire au Bodin (blood sausage) festival in Normandy, the play was written by his former co-star Brian Glover. Later that same year, he appeared with Glover in the ATV comedy-drama series Sounding Brass, that charts the misadventures of the Derbyshire based Ettaswell brass band, which ran for one series. In 1982, he appeared in the musical film Pink Floyd – The Wall, by Alan Parker, based on Pink Floyd's album The Wall. In 1983, Mort briefly appeared as a police officer in the Only Fools and Horses episode "Friday the 14th". In 1986, he featured in the two-part Lovejoy episode "Death and Venice" as Campie; later the same year he appeared as Norman in the Thames Television sitcom We'll Think of Something. In 1987, he featured as Raggles in several episodes of the 16-part BBC adaption of the novel Vanity Fair by William Makepeace Thackeray.

In one of his final acting roles, in 1989, Mort featured in the Minder episode "The Wrong Goodbye" as Billy, who is coerced into receiving a consignment of dolls by Arthur Daley, before the bank seizes Daley's business for non-payment.

== Selected filmography ==
Year	Title	Role	Notes
1956	Play of the Week	Reporter	Story: "Shooting Star"
1960	Armchair Theatre	Corporal Tomkins	Story: "Hail the Conquering Hero"
1960	Skyport	Jack	Episode: "Landfall"
1960 – 1961	Coronation Street	Ron Bailey	5 episodes
1961	Armchair Theatre	Tubbs	Story: "Looking for Frankie"
1961	No Hiding Place	Gobbo Smith	Episode: "Explosion Underground"
1962	Z-Cars	Felix	Episode: "Sudden Death"
1962	Z-Cars	Man	Episode: "Johnny Sailor"
1962 – 1964	Coronation Street	Harry Bailey	6 episodes
1963	No Hiding Place	Postman	Episode: "Four Faces of Clare"
1963	Taxi!	Bernard	Episode: "Don't Do as I Do"
1963 – 1964	The Plane Makers	Sam/ Jack Brough	4 episodes
1964	Dixon of Dock Green	Mr. Arkwright	Episode: "The Witness"
1964	No Hiding Place	Bert Lane	Episode: "Rogue's Gallery"
1964	The Wednesday Play	Peasant	Story: A Crack in the Ice"
1965	Dixon of Dock Green	Charlie	Episode: "Other People's Lives"
1965	Mogul	Jack Hartley	Episode: "Safety Man"
1965	Z-Cars	Dodds	Episode: "Another Fairytale"
1968	Crime Buster	Jimmy Vine	13 episodes
1968	Softly Softly	Bob Spender	Episode: "Quicker by Rail"
1968	Z-Cars	Collinstone	Episode: "Collinstone" (2 parts)
1970	Doomwatch	Jones	Episode: "The Battery People"
1971	Softy Softy Taskforce	Dent	Episode: "An Inside Job"
1972	Owen M.D.	Harry Spence	2 episodes
1973	Follyfoot	Policeman	Episode: "Sell the Tiger"
1973	Shabby Tiger	Joe Kepple	4 episodes
1972 – 1974	Play for Today	Ern	3 episodes
1974	Justice	Ted Watson	Episode: "Under Suspicion"
1974	Special Branch	Ron Murray	Episode: "Stand and Deliver"
1974	South Riding	Barney Holly	7 episodes
1975	The Evacuees	Louis	TV Movie
1975	Churchill's People	Church Commissioner	Episode: "America!, America!"
1975	The Cuckoo Waltz	Truscott	Episode: "House for Sale"
1975	The Good Life	Angler	Episode: "The Thing in the Cellar"
1975	It's a Lovely Day Tomorrow	John Bell	TV Movie
1975	The Sweeney	Driscoll	Episode: "Ringer"
1976	Our Mutual Friend	Mr. Wilfer	4 episodes
1976	Softy Softy Taskforce	George Barton	Episode: "As Good Cooks Go..."
1976 – 1977	Oh No It's Selwyn Froggitt	Ray	21 episodes
1977	Esther Waters	Jim Saunders	1 episode
1977	Survivors	Joe Briggs	Episode: "Long Live The King"
1977	The XYY Man	DS King	2 episodes
1978 – 1988	All Creatures Great and Small	Mr. Wiggins	2 episodes
1979	Crown Court	Tommy Weekes	Episode: "The Irish Connection" (2 parts)
1980	Dick Turpin	Radstock	Episode: "The Judge"
1980	Play for Today	George Willis	Story: "Thicker than Water"
1980	Juliet Bravo	Walter Pengally	Episode: "Oscar"
1980	The Other 'Arf	Stan	Episode: "Never the Twain"
1980	Sounding Brass	Gerry Thompson	6 episodes
1981	Bergerac	Kranski	Episode: "See You in Moscow"
1981	The Chinese Detective	Polish Caretaker	2 episodes
1981	Crown Court	John Winder	Episode: "Proof Spirits" (2 parts)
1981	The Good Companions	Pitsner	Episode: "Salvage Work"
1981	Juliet Bravo	Jack Willis	Episode: "Party Fun"
1981	When the Boat Comes In	Manny Goldstein	Episode: "Action!"
1982	Pink Floyd - The Wall	Playground Father	Film
1983	Give Us a Break	Solly Goldstein	Episode: "When It Rains, It Pours"
1983	Only Fools and Horses	Policeman	Episode: "Friday the 14th"
1983 – 1984	Hallelujah!	Benge/ Harold Marshall	2 episodes
1984	Duty Free	George	2 episodes
1985	Lytton's Diary	Porter	Episode: "The Lady in the Mask"
1986	Lovejoy	Campie	Episode: "Death and Venice" (2 parts)
1986	We'll Think of Something	Norman	6 episodes
1987	Casualty	Albie Monday	Episode: "Hooked"
1987	Vanity Fair	Raggles	7 episodes
1988	The Bill	Mr. Baxter	Episode: "Stop and Search"
1989	Minder	Billy	Episode: "The Wrong Goodbye"
1989	Young Charlie Chaplin	William Jackson	1 episode (final role)
