= Ron Cook =

English actor (born 1948)

- Born: Ronald G. Cook; 1 December 1948 (age 77); South Shields, County Durham, England
- Occupation: Actor

Ronald G. Cook (born 1 December 1948) is an English actor. He has been active in film, television and theatre since the 1970s.

== Early life ==
Cook was born in 1948 in South Shields, County Durham, the son of a school cook and a car worker. When he was 6, his family moved to Coventry; he went to Wyken Croft Junior School and then Caludon Castle School and is a graduate of Rose Bruford College.

== Career ==
On stage, he appeared in the original 1988 production of Timberlake Wertenbaker's play Our Country's Good. He was nominated for a Laurence Olivier Award in the category of Best Supporting Actor in 2000 for his role in Juno and the Paycock at the Donmar Warehouse. He appeared at the same theatre the same year in Helpless.

He appeared in Conor McPherson's play The Seafarer, In 2008–2009, he took part in the Donmar's West End season at Wyndham's Theatre, playing Sir Toby Belch in Twelfth Night and Polonius in Hamlet. In 2011, he played The Fool in King Lear starring Derek Jacobi at the Donmar and on an 8-week tour. In 2013, Cook played the part of Pistol in Michael Grandage's Henry V (with Jude Law in the title role). From November 2015 to February 2016 he played Max in The Homecoming at Trafalgar Studios, and later appeared at the Donmar Warehouse as Teddy in Brian Friel's Faith Healer in 2016. From November 2016 to January 2017, Cook appeared in Lucy Kirkwood's new play The Children at The Royal Court Theatre with Francesca Annis and Deborah Findlay. In July 2017, he appeared as Dr Walker at The Old Vic in Girl from the North Country.

He has performed in a large number of television productions, including guest roles in episodes of series such as The Black Adder where he played "Sean the Irish bastard" (1983), and Bergerac (1988), Sharpe (1994) and Doctor Who, "The Idiot's Lantern" (2006). He was in the BBC's The Complete Dramatic Works of William Shakespeare (1982–83), notably as Richard, Duke of Gloucester, later Richard III of England in Jane Howell's repertory treatment of the Henry VI plays and Richard III. He appeared as one of the unnamed "mysterious men" haunting the imagination of Michael Gambon's hospitalised writer in Dennis Potter's acclaimed 1986 serial The Singing Detective, Jack Rosenthal British television play Day To Remember and has featured in several costume dramas, including Stephen Poliakoff's The Lost Prince (2002 as David Lloyd George), an adaptation of The Hound of the Baskervilles (2002, as Barrymore), a TV adaptation of The Other Boleyn Girl, (2003 as Thomas Cromwell), Anthony Trollope's adaptation He Knew He Was Right (2004, as Bozzel), and Russell T. Davies's Casanova (2005, as the prisoner in the cell next to Casanova's). In 2003, he played the part of Doughty, Admiral Pellew's and later Hornblower's steward in the Hornblower. In 2006, Cook appeared as Kenneth Williams' agent Peter Eade in the BBC biopic Kenneth Williams: Fantabulosa!.

In 2003, he portrayed Victorian engineer Isambard Kingdom Brunel in the BBC's Seven Wonders of the Industrial World. In 2008, he played Mr Chivery in the TV serial Little Dorrit, based on the novel by Charles Dickens. He has also appeared in the children's TV series Summerhill, as an inspector. He played the role of an orthodox Jewish rabbi (Noach Marowski) in a 2008 edition of Silent Witness. He played the role of Hermann van Daan in the 2009 BBC drama, The Diary of Anne Frank, as well as the part of David Cockram in the ITV drama Whatever It Takes, aired in the same year. In late 2012 Cook played the role of Peter in the ITV series Mrs Biggs, a retired train driver, Ronnie Biggs befriends, employed by the gang to drive the hijacked train away during the Great Train Robbery. Cook played the company accountant, Mr Arthur Crabb, in the ITV series Mr Selfridge (2013 to 2016). In 2018 he portrayed a police chief in the BBC drama The City and the City. In 2019 he played television producer Bill Calder in Death in Paradise S8:E3, and later portrayed Borch Three Jackdaws in Netflix's The Witcher. In 2020 he played Stan Sturgess in the three-part fact-based BBC drama The Salisbury Poisonings, which portrays the 2018 Novichok poisoning crisis in Salisbury, England. Cook played the father of Dawn Sturgess who was the only fatality in the crisis. In 2022, Cook played the role of the 'Wise Owl' and its voice actor Wilf in the show “Inside No.9” in the episode "Wise Owl".

He has played Napoleon Bonaparte twice, in his 1994 guest appearance in Sharpe and again in the 2000 feature film Quills. Other film roles have included parts in The Cook, the Thief, His Wife & Her Lover (1989, as Mews), Secrets & Lies (1996), The Odyssey (1997, as Eurybates), Topsy-Turvy (1999, as Richard D'Oyly Carte), Chocolat (2000), Charlotte Gray (2001), 24 Hour Party People (2002, as Derek Ryder), Thunderbirds (2004, as Parker), 102 Dalmatians, Hot Fuzz (2007, as George Merchant) and The King's Man (2021, as Archduke Franz Ferdinand). Cook also appeared in Feeling Good, a short film written by Dexter Fletcher and directed by Dalia Ibelhauptaite.

Cook has also acted in radio drama. In 2007 he played the part of confidence trickster Captain Wragge in a BBC Radio 4 adaption of the Wilkie Collins novel No Name. In July 2007, he played the part of Kris Kelvin, the protagonist psychologist on the BBC Radio 4 adaptation of Solaris, Stanislaw Lem's novel. In December 2014, he played Jacob Marley in Neil Brand's BBC Radio 4 adaptation of A Christmas Carol.

== Filmography ==
=== Film ===
Year	Title	Role	Notes
1976	Secrets of a Superstud	Telegram Boy	
1984	Scandalous	3rd Taxi Driver	
1989	The Cook, the Thief, His Wife & Her Lover	Mews	
1996	Secrets & Lies	Stuart	
1999	Topsy-Turvy	Richard D'Oyly Carte	
2000	Quills	Napoleon Bonaparte	
2000	102 Dalmatians	Mr. Button	
2000	Chocolat	Alphonse Marceau	
2001	Lucky Break	Mr. Perry	
2001	Charlotte Gray	Mirabel	
2002	24 Hour Party People	Derek Ryder	
2004	Thunderbirds	Aloysius Parker	
2004	The Merchant of Venice	Old Gobbo	
2005	On a Clear Day	Norman	
2006	Land of the Blind	Doc	
2006	Confetti	Sam's Father	
2007	Hot Fuzz	George Merchant	
2021	The King's Man	Archduke Franz Ferdinand of Austria	
2022	Empire of Light	Mr. Cooper	
2023	The Critic	Hugh Morris	
2024	Sew Torn	Oskar	

=== Television ===
Year	Title	Role	Notes
1975	Ballet Shoes	Frank	Miniseries, 1 episode
1978	Will Shakespeare	Jack Rice	Miniseries, 6 episodes
1982	Whoops Apocalypse	Arab Beggar	1 episode
1982	BBC Television Shakespeare	Various roles	Recurring role, 5 episodes
1983	Blackadder	Sean, The Irish Bastard	1 episode
1984	The Young Ones	Prisoner on Ship	Episode: "Nasty"
1985	Girls on Top	Ian	1 episode
1986	The Singing Detective	First Mysterious Man	Miniseries, 6 episodes
1986	Day To Remember	Graham	Television film
1988	Bergerac	Reggie Betts	1 episode
1988	Theatre Night	La Fleche	1 episode
1990	Boon	Derek Kline	1 episode
1990, 1994	The Bill	Peter Angell/Thomas Ellis	2 episodes
1992	Maigret	Pernelle	1 episode
1992	Boys from the Bush	George	1 episode
1993	The Chief	James Baddeley	1 episode
1994	The Detectives	Blind Billy	1 episode
1994	Sharpe	Napoleon Bonaparte	Episode: "Sharpe's Honour"
1995	Hawkeye	Black Eagle	1 episode
1996	Bramwell	Percy Banks	1 episode
1997	The Odyssey	Eurybates	Miniseries, 2 episodes
1997	The History of Tom Jones: a Foundling	Benjamin Partridge	Miniseries, 5 episodes
2001	Armadillo	Phil	Miniseries, 2 episodes
2002	Murder	Gareth McGuinness	Miniseries, 1 episode
2002	The Hound of the Baskervilles	Mr. Barrymore	Television film
2003	Hornblower	Steward James Doughty	2 episodes
2003	The Lost Prince	David Lloyd George	Miniseries, 2 episodes
2003	The Other Boleyn Girl	Thomas Cromwell	Television film
2003	Thursday the 12th	Liam Donnelly	Television film
2003	Seven Wonders of the Industrial World	Isambard Kingdom Brunel	Miniseries, 1 episode
2004	He Knew He Was Right	Mr. Bozzle	Miniseries, 4 episodes
2005	Casanova	Prisoner	Miniseries, 2 episodes
2005	Funland	Hitman 1	Miniseries, 7 episodes
2006	Kenneth Williams: Fantabulosa!	Peter Eade	Television film
2006	Doctor Who	Mr. Magpie	Episode: "The Idiot's Lantern"
2007	Foyle's War	Eddie Baker	1 episode
2008	10 Days to War	Peter	Miniseries, 1 episode
2008	Waking the Dead	Dr. Milan Vaspovic	2 episodes
2008	Filth: The Mary Whitehouse Story	Charles Hill, Baron Hill of Luton	Television film
2008	Burn Up	Sir Richard Langham	Miniseries, 1 episode
2008	Silent Witness	Rabbi Marowski	2 episodes
2008	Little Dorrit	Mr. Chivery	Miniseries, 9 episodes
2008	Summerhill	Wharton	Television film
2009	The Diary of Anne Frank	Hermann van Daan	Miniseries, 5 episodes
2009	Personal Affairs	Bernie Lerner	4 episodes
2010	Garrow's Law	Captain Baillie	1 episode
2011	Midsomer Murders	Bernard Flack	1 episode
2012	Bert and Dickie	Albert	Television film
2012	Mrs Biggs	Peter	Miniseries, 2 episodes
2013–2016	Mr Selfridge	Mr. Crabb	Main role, 40 episodes
2018	The City and the City	Commissar Gadlem	Miniseries, 4 episodes
2019	Les Misérables	Hair and Teeth Dealer	Miniseries, 2 episodes
2019	Death in Paradise	Billy Calder	1 episode
2019	Chernobyl	Old Maternity Doctor	Miniseries, 2 episodes
2019	The Witcher	Borch Three Jackdaws	1 episode
2020	The Salisbury Poisonings	Stan Sturgess	Miniseries, 2 episodes
2020	Des	DSI Geoff Chambers	Miniseries, 3 episodes
2022	Life After Life	Dr. Fellowes	Miniseries, 3 episodes
2022	Inside No. 9	Wilf	Episode "Wise Owl"
2022	Andor	Willi	2 episodes
2022	Doc Martin	Leonard Maitland	1 episode
