= Alan Parker =

English filmmaker (1944–2020)

Sir Alan Parker CBE
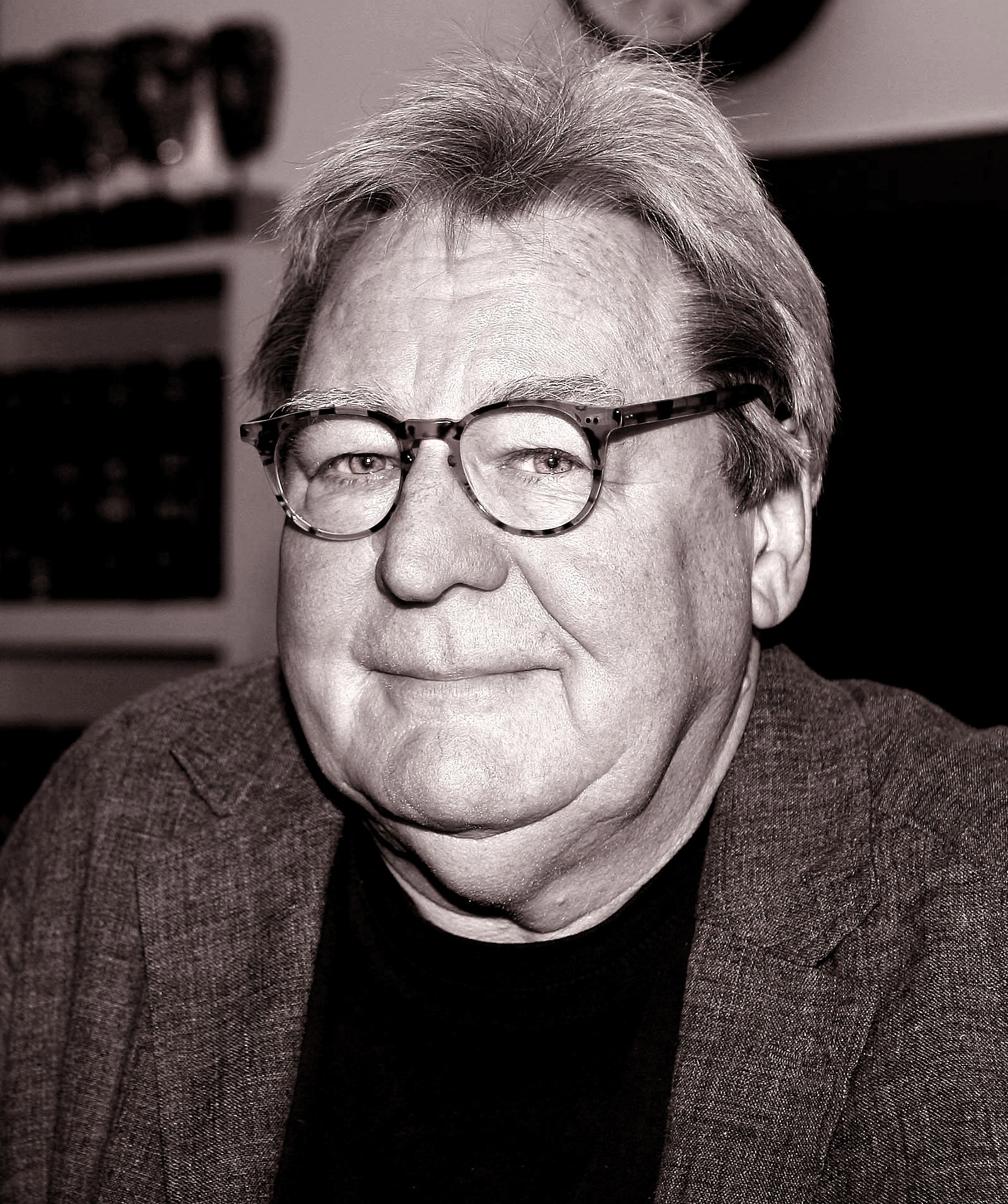
- Parker in 2008
- Born: Alan William Parker; 14 February 1944; Islington, London, England
- Died: 31 July 2020 (aged 76); London, England
- Education: Dame Alice Owen's School
- Occupations: Film director; screenwriter; producer
- Years active: 1971–2003
- Spouses: Annie Inglis (m. 1966; div. 1992): Lisa Moran
- Children: 5, including Nathan
- Website: alanparker.com

Sir Alan William Parker (14 February 1944 – 31 July 2020) was an English filmmaker. His early career, beginning in his late teens, was spent as a copywriter and director of television advertisements. After about ten years of filming adverts, many of which won awards for creativity, he began screenwriting and directing films.

Parker was known for using a wide range of filmmaking styles and working in differing genres. He directed musicals, including Bugsy Malone (1976), Fame (1980), Pink Floyd – The Wall (1982), The Commitments (1991), and Evita (1996), true-story dramas, including Midnight Express (1978), Mississippi Burning (1988), Come See the Paradise (1990), and Angela's Ashes (1999), family dramas, including Shoot the Moon (1982), and horrors and thrillers including Angel Heart (1987), and The Life of David Gale (2003).

Parker's films won nineteen BAFTA awards, ten Golden Globes and six Academy Awards. His film Birdy was chosen by the National Board of Review as one of the Top Ten Films of 1984 and won the Grand Prix Spécial du Jury prize at the 1985 Cannes Film Festival. In 1984, Parker received the BAFTA for Outstanding British Contribution to Cinema, and in 2002 he was knighted for his services to the film industry. He was active in both British cinema and American cinema, along with being a founding member of the Directors Guild of Great Britain and lecturing at various film schools.

In 2000, Parker received the Royal Photographic Society Lumière Award for major achievement in cinematography, video or animation. In 2013, he received the BAFTA Academy Fellowship Award, the highest honour the British Film Academy can give a filmmaker. Parker donated his personal archive to the British Film Institute's National Archive in 2015.

Along with Hugh Hudson, Adrian Lyne, Ridley Scott, and Tony Scott, Parker was part of the "Adland Five" of British directors operating in the late 1970s and early 1980s who first established themselves in the advertising world, before going on to Hollywood success. The group's influence has been cited by the likes of Christopher Nolan and Christopher Frayling.

== Early years and education ==
Parker was born on 14 February 1944 into a working-class family in Islington, North London, the son of Elsie Ellen, a dressmaker, and William Leslie Parker, a house painter. He grew up on a council estate in Islington, which always made it easy for him to remain "almost defiantly working-class in attitudes" said the British novelist and screenwriter Ray Connolly. Parker said that although he had his share of fun growing up, he always felt he was studying for his secondary school exams, while his friends were out having a good time. He had an "ordinary background" with no aspirations to become a film director, nor did anyone in his family have any desire to be involved in the film industry. The closest he ever came, he said, to anything related to films was learning photography, a hobby inspired by his uncles: "...that early introduction to photography is something I remember". Parker attended Dame Alice Owen's School, concentrating on science in his last year. He left school when he was 18 to work in the advertising field, hoping that the advertising industry might be a good way to meet girls.

== Career ==
=== 1962–1975: Early work and breakthrough ===
Parker's first job was office boy in the post room of Ogilvy & Mather an advertising agency in London. But more than anything, he said, he wanted to write, and would write essays and ads when he got home after work. His colleagues also encouraged him to write, which soon led him to a position as a copywriter in the company. Parker took jobs with different agencies over the next few years, having by then become proficient as a copywriter. One such agency was Collett Dickenson Pearce in London, where he first met the future producers David Puttnam and Alan Marshall, both of whom would later produce many of his films. Parker credited Puttnam with inspiring him and talking him into writing his first film script, Melody (1971).

By 1968, Parker had moved from copywriting to successfully directing numerous television advertisements. In 1970, he joined Marshall to establish a company to make advertisements. That company eventually became one of Britain's best commercial production houses, winning nearly every major national and international award open to it. Among their award-winning adverts were the UK Cinzano vermouth advertisement (starring Joan Collins and Leonard Rossiter), and a Heineken advert which used 100 actors. Parker credited his years writing and directing adverts for his later success as a film director:

Looking back, I came from a generation of filmmakers who couldn't have really started anywhere but commercials, because we had no film industry in the United Kingdom at the time. People like Ridley Scott, Tony Scott, Adrian Lyne, Hugh Hudson, and myself. So commercials proved to be incredibly important.

After writing the screenplay for the Waris Hussein film Melody in 1971, Parker shot his first fictional film titled No Hard Feelings in 1972, for which he wrote the script. The film is a bleak love story set against the Blitz in London during the Second World War, when the Luftwaffe bombed the city for 57 consecutive nights. Parker was born during one of those bombing raids, and said "the baby in that [film] could well have been me". With no feature film directing experience, he could not find financial backing, and decided to risk using his own money and funds from mortgaging his house to cover the cost. The film impressed the BBC, which bought the film and showed it on television a few years later in 1976. The BBC producer Mark Shivas had, in the interim, also contracted Parker to direct The Evacuees (1975), a Second World War story written by Jack Rosenthal which was shown as a Play for Today. The work was based on true events which involved the evacuation of school children from central Manchester. The Evacuees won a BAFTA for best TV drama and also an Emmy for best International Drama.

Parker next wrote and directed his first feature film, Bugsy Malone (1976), a parody of early American gangster films and American musicals, but with only child actors. Parker's desire in making the film was to entertain both children and adults with a unique concept and style of film:

I'd worked a lot with kids and I had four very young children of my own at the time. When you do have young children like that you're very sensitive to the kind of materials that's available for them ... The only kind of movies they could see were Walt Disney movies ... I thought it would be nice to make a movie that would be good for the kids, and also the adults that had to take them. So to be absolutely honest, Bugsy Malone was a pragmatic exercise to break into American film.

The film received eight British Academy Award nominations and five Awards, including two BAFTAs for Jodie Foster.

=== 1978–1990: Subsequent success ===
Parker next directed Midnight Express (1978), based on a true account by Billy Hayes about his incarceration and escape from a Turkish prison for trying to smuggle hashish out of the country. Parker made the film in order to do something radically different from Bugsy Malone, which would broaden his style of filmmaking. The script was written by Oliver Stone in his first screenplay, and won Stone his first Academy Award. The music was composed by Giorgio Moroder, who was also awarded his first Oscar for the film. Midnight Express established Parker as a "front rank director", as both he and the film were Oscar nominated. The success of that film also gave him the freedom from then on to direct films of his own choosing.

Parker then directed Fame (1980), which follows the lives of eight students through their years at the New York City's High School of Performing Arts. It was a huge box-office success and led to a television spin-off series of the same name. Parker stated that after doing a serious drama like Midnight Express, he wanted to do a film with music, but very different from typical musicals of the past. Having already done Bugsy Malone, he felt confident that he knew how to go about creating a musical where the songs emerge from real situations.

Actress Irene Cara recalled that "the nice thing about the way Alan works with everyone is that he allowed us to really feel like classmates". However, Parker was refused permission to use the actual school portrayed in the film because of the foul language in the screenplay.

Parker's next film was Shoot the Moon (1982), the story of a marital break-up that takes place in Northern California. Parker calls it "the first grown-up film that I'd done". He again chose to direct a subject distinctly different from his previous film, explaining, "I really try to do different work. I think that by doing different work each time, it keeps you creatively fresher". He described the theme of the film being about "two people who can't live together but who also can't let go of one another. A story of fading love, senseless rage, and the inevitable bewildering betrayal in the eyes of the children". Its stars, Albert Finney and Diane Keaton, received Golden Globe nominations for their performances.

The film also had a personal significance for Parker, who said he was forced to examine his own marriage: "It was a painful film to make for me because there were echoes of my own life in it. It was about a breakup of a marriage, and the children in the story were quite close to my own children in age. Shoot the Moon was very, very close to my own life". He spent days with the writer Bo Goldman on developing a realistic story, and states that his marriage became "infinitely stronger" as a result of the film.

Also in 1982 Parker directed a film version of the Pink Floyd conceptual rock opera, The Wall, which starred Boomtown Rats frontman Bob Geldof as the fictive rocker "Pink". Parker later described the filming as "one of the most miserable experiences of my creative life". Though not a major box office success, receiving lukewarm reviews from critics, the film has since become a cult classic amongst Pink Floyd fans.

Parker directed Birdy (1984), starring Matthew Modine and Nicolas Cage. It recounts the story of two school friends who have returned from the Vietnam War but who were both psychologically and physically injured. Parker called it a "wonderful story" after having read the book by William Wharton. However, because of the nature of the story, he had no idea how to make it into a movie: "I didn't know if you could take the poetry of the book and make it cinematic poetry, or if an audience would actually want it".

The film became a critical success. Richard Schickel says that Parker had "transcended realism ... [and] achieved his personal best", while Derek Malcolm considers Birdy to be Parker's "most mature and perhaps his best movie". The message of the film, writes critic Quentin Falk, is "joyously life-affirming", which he notes is common to much of Parker's work. He adds that Parker's films manage to achieve a blend of "strong story and elegant frame", a style which he says typically eludes other directors who rely too much on the purely visual.

Continuing to explore different genres, Parker made a film that bridged horror and thriller territory, Angel Heart (1987), starring Mickey Rourke, Lisa Bonet, and Robert De Niro. He later wrote that he was fascinated by its "fusion of two genres: the noir, Chandleresque detective novel and the supernatural". The film was a disappointment at the box office, and received mixed reviews at the time, but has since become a cult classic.

With Mississippi Burning (1988), Parker received his second Oscar nomination for Best Director. The film is based on a true story about the murders of three civil rights workers in 1964, and stars Gene Hackman and Willem Dafoe. Hackman was nominated for Best Actor, while the film was nominated for five other Oscars, including Best Picture. It won for Best Cinematography.

Despite commercial success, Mississippi Burning received considerable criticism for centering three white characters in a story about the civil rights movement. Parker later wrote, "Certainly, the two protagonists of Mississippi Burning are white. At that time the film would never have been made if they weren't". He tried to address this in his next movie, Come See the Paradise (1990), about the internment of Japanese-Americans during World War II. Before and after making the film, he sought input from the community, agreeing to cast Japanese-American actress Tamlyn Tomita in the lead instead of a Chinese-American actress. However, the film ultimately faced similar criticism to Mississippi Burning, for focusing on a white character played by Dennis Quaid. As one woman who was born in the Gila River internment camp told the Rafu Shimpo newspaper, "My parents saw the movie and they said the camp scenes were authentic. It was interesting for me. I liked it". However, she added, "I would've preferred to see a Japanese actor in the role of Dennis Quaid".

=== 1991–2003: Later works ===
In 1991 Parker directed The Commitments, a comedy about working class Dubliners who form a soul band. The film was an international success and led to a successful soundtrack album. To find a cast Parker visited most of the estimated 1,200 different bands then playing throughout Dublin. He met with over 3,000 different band members. Rather than pick known actors, Parker says he chose young musicians, most of whom had no acting experience, in order to remain "truthful to the story". "I cast everybody to be very close to the character that they play in the film. They're not really playing outside of who they are as people". Parker says he wanted to make the film because he could relate to the hardships in the lives of young Dubliners, having come from a similar working-class background in north London.

Film critic David Thomson observes that with The Commitments, Parker "showed an unusual fondness for people, place, and music. It was as close as Parker has come to optimism". Parker said that it was the "most enjoyable" time he had making a film, to the extent that he would have been glad he made it even if it had ended up being terrible.

Parker's next film was The Road to Wellville, an adaptation of T. C. Boyle's novel about Dr. John Harvey Kellogg, the eccentric inventor of corn flakes (played by Anthony Hopkins). The film proved unsuccessful with both audiences and critics. However, novelist Boyle was pleased with the adaptation, calling it "daring, experimental, ballsy – it's something new for Christ's sake, new!… and killingly funny".

Evita (1996), was another musical, starring Madonna, Antonio Banderas and Jonathan Pryce. Andrew Lloyd Webber and Tim Rice's score originated from the earlier musical. Evita was nominated for five Academy Awards, winning for Best Original Song, which was sung by Madonna.

Parker's next film was Angela's Ashes (1999), a drama based on the real-life experiences of the Irish-American teacher Frank McCourt and his childhood. His family was forced to move from the United States back to Ireland because of financial difficulties, which led to the family's problems caused by his father's alcoholism.

Colm Meaney, who acted in The Commitments, noticed the dramatic shift in theme and style of Parker's films. He said "It's the variety of his work that sort of staggers me. He can go from Evita to Angela's Ashes. When Alan starts a project, it's going to be something very interesting and completely out of left field". Parker explained that "To do a film like Angela's Ashes, I suppose, was my reaction against a big film like Evita". He said that he tried to avoid the "obvious movies", and "You want the film to stay with people afterwards ... It just seems to me that the greatest crime is to make just another movie". Parker said it is important to carefully choose which films to write and direct:

My mentor was the great director, Fred Zinnemann, whom I used to show all my films to until he died. He said something to me that I always try to keep in my head every time I decide on what film to do next. He told me that making a film was a great privilege, and you should never waste it.

Therefore, when Parker visited film schools and spoke to young filmmakers, he told them that the new film technology available for making films and telling a story is less important than conveying a message: "If you haven't got something to say, I don't think you should be a filmmaker".

British film critic Geoff Andrew described Parker as a "natural storyteller" who got his message across using "dramatic lighting, vivid characterisation, scenes of violent conflict regularly interrupting sequences of expository dialogue, and an abiding sympathy for the underdog (he is a born liberal with a keen sense of injustice)".

Parker produced and directed The Life of David Gale (2003), a crime thriller about an advocate for the abolition of capital punishment who finds himself on death row after having been convicted of murdering a fellow activist. The film received generally poor reviews.

In addition to his work as a filmmaker, Parker was a published author. His first book was a novelization of his screenplay for Bugsy Malone. He went on to write a children's book, Puddles in the Lane (1977), and the well-reviewed novel The Sucker's Kiss (2003). Parker was also a prolific cartoonist, with several collections of his cartoons published as books.

== Personal life ==
Parker was married twice, first to Annie Inglis from 1966 until their divorce in 1992, and then to producer Lisa Moran, to whom he was married until his death. He had five children, including screenwriter Nathan Parker. Parker died in London on 31 July 2020 at age 76, following a lengthy illness.

== Honours and awards ==
Parker was nominated for eight BAFTA awards, three Golden Globes and two Oscars. He was a founding member of the Directors Guild of Great Britain and lectured at film schools around the world. In 1985, the British Academy awarded him the Michael Balcon Award for Outstanding Contribution to British Cinema. Parker was appointed Commander of the Order of the British Empire (CBE) in the 1995 Birthday Honours and Knight Bachelor in the 2002 New Year Honours for services to the film industry. In 1999 he was given the Lifetime Achievement Award by the Directors Guild of Great Britain. He became chairman of the Board of Governors of the British Film Institute (BFI) in 1998 and in 1999 was appointed the first chairman of the newly formed UK Film Council.

In 2005 Parker received an honorary Doctorate of Arts from the University of Sunderland of which his long-time associate Lord Puttnam is chancellor. In 2004 he was the Chairman of the Jury at the 26th Moscow International Film Festival. In 2013 he was awarded the BAFTA Academy Fellowship Award "in recognition of outstanding achievement in the art forms of the moving image", which is the highest honour the British Academy can bestow.

The British Film Institute (BFI) produced a tribute to Parker in September and October 2015 with an event titled "Focus on Sir Alan Parker" which included multiple screenings of his films and an on-stage interview of Parker by producer David Puttnam. The event coincided and marked the donation of his entire working archive to the BFI National Archive.

Academy Awards

Year	Title	Category	Result
1979	Midnight Express	Best Director	Nominated
1989	Mississippi Burning	Best Director	Nominated

BAFTAs

Year	Title	Category	Result
British Academy Film Awards
1977	Bugsy Malone	Best Direction	Nominated
1977	Bugsy Malone	Best Screenplay	Won
1979	Midnight Express	Best Direction	Won
1981	Fame	Best Direction	Nominated
1985	—N/a	Michael Balcon Award	Honored
1990	Mississippi Burning	Best Direction	Nominated
1992	The Commitments	Best Film	Won
1992	The Commitments	Best Direction	Won
1997	Evita	Best Adapted Screenplay	Nominated
2013	—N/a	BAFTA Fellowship	Honored
British Academy Television Awards
1976	The Evacuees	Best Single Play	Won

Directors Guild of America

Year	Title	Category	Result
1979	Midnight Express	Outstanding Directorial Achievement in Motion Pictures	Nominated
1989	Mississippi Burning	Outstanding Directorial Achievement in Motion Pictures	Nominated

Golden Globes

Year	Title	Category	Result
1979	Midnight Express	Best Director – Motion Picture	Nominated
1989	Mississippi Burning	Best Director – Motion Picture	Nominated
1997	Evita	Best Director – Motion Picture	Nominated

Accolades received by Parker's films
Year	Title	Academy Awards		BAFTAs		Golden Globes	
Year	Title	Nominations	Wins	Nominations	Wins	Nominations	Wins
1976	Bugsy Malone	1		9	5	3	
1978	Midnight Express	6	2	6	3	8	6
1980	Fame	6	2	4	1	4	1
1982	Shoot the Moon			1		2	
1982	Pink Floyd - The Wall			2	2		
1988	Mississippi Burning	7	1	5	3	4	
1991	The Commitments	1		6	4	1	
1996	Evita	5	1	8		5	3
1999	Angela's Ashes	1		3		1	
Total		27	6	44	18	28	10

Directed Academy Award performances Under Parker's direction, these actors have received Academy Award nominations for their performances in their respective roles.

Year	Performer	Film	Result
Academy Award for Best Actor
1988	Gene Hackman	Mississippi Burning	Nominated
Academy Award for Best Supporting Actor
1978	John Hurt	Midnight Express	Nominated
Academy Award for Best Supporting Actress
1988	Frances McDormand	Mississippi Burning	Nominated

== Filmography ==
Year	Title	Director	Writer	Producer	Notes
1971	Melody	No	Yes	No	
1974	Our Cissy	Yes	Yes	No	Short films
1974	Footsteps	Yes	Yes	No	Short films
1975	The Evacuees	Yes	No	No	TV film
1976	Bugsy Malone	Yes	Yes	No	
1976	No Hard Feelings	Yes	Yes	No	TV film
1978	Midnight Express	Yes	No	No	
1980	Fame	Yes	No	No	
1982	Shoot the Moon	Yes	No	No	
1982	Pink Floyd – The Wall	Yes	No	No	
1984	Birdy	Yes	No	No	
1986	A Turnip Head's Guide to British Cinema	Yes	No	No	Documentary
1987	Angel Heart	Yes	Yes	No	
1988	Mississippi Burning	Yes	No	No	
1990	Come See the Paradise	Yes	Yes	No	
1991	The Commitments	Yes	No	No	
1994	The Road to Wellville	Yes	Yes	Yes	
1996	Evita	Yes	Yes	Yes	Also played the Tormented Film Director in one of the scenes
1999	Angela's Ashes	Yes	Yes	Yes	
2003	The Life of David Gale	Yes	No	Yes	

== See also ==
- List of Academy Award winners and nominees from Great Britain

Preceded by Nick Park	NFTS Honorary Fellowship	Succeeded by David Yates
