= Susan Littler =

English actress (1947–1982)

- in Another Sunday and Sweet F.A. (1972)
- Born: 31 December 1947; Fleetwood, Lancashire, England
- Died: 11 July 1982 (aged 34); London, England
- Occupation: Actress
- Years active: c. 1969 – 1982

Susan Littler (31 December 1947 – 11 July 1982) was an English actress who appeared in many television and stage productions in the 1970s and early 1980s, before her death from cancer. A versatile and respected actress, Littler is perhaps best remembered for her BAFTA nominated role in the 1977 BBC Play for Today production Spend, Spend, Spend (1977), directed by John Goldschmidt. Her film career included roles in the 1973 film version of The Lovers, and Rough Cut (1980) starring Burt Reynolds. Littler was also a Royal Variety award winner.

== Television ==
Born in Fleetwood, Lancashire, Littler trained at the Webber Douglas Academy of Dramatic Art in London and started her career working in repertory in provincial theatres around Britain, including Bolton, Darlington, Plymouth and Nottingham. She made her first television appearance in a 1970 ITV Playhouse production Don't Touch Him, He Might Resent It, followed by Another Sunday and Sweet F.A. (1972), a Jack Rosenthal football-based drama also for ITV. During the early 1970s, Littler played roles of varying sizes in several of the most popular British TV shows of the time, including the soap operas Coronation Street and Emmerdale Farm, police dramas Z-Cars, Softly, Softly: Task Force and New Scotland Yard, comedies The Liver Birds and Porridge, and prison drama Within These Walls. More substantial roles came in Trinity Tales (1975), Alan Plater's contemporary reworking of The Canterbury Tales and marriage guidance serial Couples (1975–76).

Between 1974 and 1981, Littler starred in four productions for the BBC's Play for Today anthology series, the best remembered being the Jack Rosenthal adaptation of the memoirs of pools winner Viv Nicholson, Spend, Spend, Spend (1977). Nicholson, a Yorkshire housewife and mother, who had faced a constant struggle to keep her family's heads above water financially, won £152,316 on the football pools in 1961, but spent it all. Littler's performance, bringing out Nicholson's vulnerabilities as well as her excesses, was highly praised by critics and earned her a 1977 BAFTA Best Television Actress nomination. Littler's other Play for Today roles were Taking Leave (1974), A Story to Frighten the Children (1976) and Baby Talk (1981).

Littler's last TV appearances were The Quiet Days of Mrs. Stafford (an August 1981 ITV Playhouse feature), A Voyage Round My Father (1982) and Whale Music, broadcast posthumously in 1983.

== Stage ==
Towards the end of her career, Littler appeared in a number of critically acclaimed and/or high-profile London theatre productions. These included:

- The Country Wife by William Wycherley (National Theatre, 1977)
- Bedroom Farce by Alan Ayckbourn (National Theatre production, first at the Lyttleton Theatre and transferred to the Prince of Wales Theatre, 1978) – Littler also played this role in New York, where she was nominated for the 1979 Tony Award for Best Performance by a Featured Actress in a Play and the Drama Desk Award for Outstanding Featured Actress in a Play
- Uncle Vanya by Anton Chekhov (Hampstead Theatre, 1979)
- The Life and Adventures of Nicholas Nickleby adapted by David Edgar (Aldwych Theatre, 1980)
- Enjoy by Alan Bennett (Vaudeville Theatre, 1980)

== Death ==
Littler died of ovarian cancer on 11 July 1982, aged 34. Obituaries noted the loss of a talent of great promise before she had been able to realise her full potential; the Daily Telegraph described Littler's early death as "the greatest premature loss (of a British actress) since Kay Kendall".

On 24 October 1982, Albert Finney hosted a special programme in Littler's memory at London's National Theatre, with proceeds donated to cancer research.
