= The Evacuees =

1975 British TV film by Alan Parker

The Evacuees is a 1975 play written by Jack Rosenthal and directed by Alan Parker for the BBC. It was broadcast by BBC2 on 5 March 1975 with a repeat on BBC2 25 December 1975 and again on BBC1 on 13 April 1976.

It was broadcast again on BBC Four, on 16 September 2020; the continuity announcer stated it was a "freshly restored print."

Starring Rosenthal's wife, Maureen Lipman, The Evacuees won a BAFTA for Best Play and an International Emmy.

The film was released on DVD as part of a collection of Rosenthal's work for the BBC, by Acorn Media on 4 April 2011.

== Plot ==
The filmed play is set during the Blitz. Loosely based on Rosenthal's experience, it centres on the lives of two Jewish boys, Neville and Danny, who are evacuated from Manchester to Blackpool.

== Cast ==
- Maureen Lipman as Sarah Miller
- Gary Carp as Danny Miller
- Steven Serember as Neville Miller
- Margery Mason as Mrs Graham
- Ray Mort as Louis Miller
- Paul Besterman as Zuckerman
- Christine Buckley as office woman
- Ted Carroll as fireman
- Barron Casenov as Mr Grossfine
- Margery Withers as Grandma Miller
- Aubrey Edwards as Wilhelm
- Ian East as Mr Goldstone
- Ivor Roberts as Mr Graham
- Laurence Cohen as Merton
- Louis Raynes as Bernard
- Malcolm Hebden as Man in Synagogue
