= Dear Anyone =

1983 musical

Dear Anyone is a musical with book by Jack Rosenthal, lyrics by Don Black and music by Geoff Stephens. It concerns an agony aunt who can solve everyone's problems but her own.

The original production featuring Jane Lapotaire, Peter Blake and Stubby Kaye premiered at Birmingham Repertory Theatre on 12 September 1983. It opened in London's West End at the Cambridge Theatre on 8 November 1983.
