= Juggernaut (1974 film) =

1974 British thriller film directed by Richard Lester

- Original film poster by Robert McCall
- Directed by: Richard Lester
- Written by: Richard Alan Simmons as Richard DeKoker; Alan Plater
- Produced by: Richard Alan Simmons as Richard DeKoker
- Starring: Richard Harris; Omar Sharif; Freddie Jones; David Hemmings; Anthony Hopkins; Shirley Knight; Ian Holm; Clifton James; Roy Kinnear
- Cinematography: Gerry Fisher
- Edited by: Antony Gibbs
- Music by: Ken Thorne
- Production company: Two Roads
- Distributed by: United Artists
- Release date: 25 September 1974
- Running time: 110 minutes
- Country: United Kingdom
- Language: English

Juggernaut is a 1974 British crime suspense film starring Richard Harris, Omar Sharif, and Anthony Hopkins. The film, directed by Richard Lester, was largely shot on location aboard the TS Hamburg in the North Sea. It was inspired by real events aboard QE2 in May 1972 when Royal Marines and Special Boat Service personnel parachuted onto the ship because of a bomb hoax.

In the film, Richard Harris leads a team of Naval bomb disposal experts sent to disarm several large barrel bombs that have been placed aboard an ocean liner crossing the North Atlantic. Meanwhile, ashore, the police race against time to track down the mysterious bomb maker, who calls himself "Juggernaut", who will agree to a ransom in order to reveal the information that will disarm the bombs.

== Plot ==
The ocean liner SS Britannic is voyaging through the North Atlantic with 1200 passengers on board when the shipping line's owner Nicholas Porter in London receives a call from someone with an Irish accent styling himself as "Juggernaut", who claims to have placed high explosives aboard which are timed to explode and sink the ship at dawn on the following day. The drums are booby-trapped in various ways, and he warns that any attempt to move them will result in detonation, and offers that technical instructions in how to render the bombs safe will be given in exchange for a ransom of £500,000. As an indication of his seriousness, he sets off a demonstration attack with small bombs behind the ship's funnel, which injures one crewman. Unable to order an evacuation of passengers via lifeboats due to rough seas, the shipping line's management is inclined to yield to the ransom demand, however British government officials inform the company that if it does so they will withdraw the company's operating subsidy in line with the Government's policy of non-appeasement of terrorism.

Instead, a Royal Navy officer, Lt. Cmdr. Anthony Fallon, leading a bomb-disposal unit, is dispatched, arriving on the scene by air transit and parachuting, to board the ship and defuse the barrel-bombs before the deadline. Meanwhile, back in London, Supt. McCleod, whose wife and two children happen to be holidaying on board the ship, leads Scotland Yard's investigation to capture the criminal master-bomber.

After an attempt to drill a hole into a barrel-bomb fails, setting it off and damaging the ship, Fallon decides to split up his team with each man working simultaneously on each of the remaining devices around the ship, Fallon going first with each stage of the defusing operation and coordinating his men by radio link, with the aim that if he fails and his bomb explodes, his men will know what went wrong and continue the process onwards, with his second in command taking up the lead. If two more bombs go off, the ship will sink. Fallon proceeds to disarm the bomb he is working on, apparently successfully, with his men following each step. However, it contains a hidden mechanism, which his second in command, close friend Charlie Braddock, accidentally triggers, resulting in his death when it explodes, causing further damage to the ship. A distraught Fallon abandons the operation and tells the ship's captain, Alex Brunel, to advise the shipping line to pay the ransom to avoid any more carnage. However, when negotiations with Juggernaut break down (in part because Juggernaut sees the trap police set for him when he goes to collect the ransom) Fallon is ordered by the captain to continue disarming the bombs.

Meanwhile, a police search back in London captures the bomber posing as Juggernaut, who is revealed to be an embittered former British military bomb-disposal officer, Sidney Buckland. When told of the news, Fallon, still working on disabling the bombs, reveals that Buckland had trained him and once saved his life. He insists that Buckland be put in contact with him. Buckland is escorted to the police situation room. By this time Fallon has worked out the important details of his procedure but has no way of knowing which of two options (cutting a red or blue wire) will disable the bombs, and if he chooses the wrong one it will detonate them. Time is running out and dawn is fast approaching. Fallon and Juggernaut talk, and, because of their former comradeship, Juggernaut agrees to tell Fallon how to safely disarm the bombs. Juggernaut orders to ‘cut the blue wire’ over audio. Fallon, sensing he is being lied to, cuts the red wire instead and manages to disable the bomb. The rest of the bomb-disposal unit follow Fallon's example, and the ship and its passengers are saved.

== Cast ==
- Richard Harris as Lieutenant Commander Anthony Fallon
- Omar Sharif as Captain Alex Brunel
- David Hemmings as Charlie Braddock
- Anthony Hopkins as Superintendent John McLeod
- Shirley Knight as Barbara Bannister
- Ian Holm as Nicholas Porter
- Clifton James as Corrigan
- Roy Kinnear as Ship's Social Director Curtain
- Caroline Mortimer as Susan McLeod
- Mark Burns as Hollingsworth
- John Stride as Hughes
- Freddie Jones as Sidney Buckland
- Julian Glover as Commander Marder
- Cyril Cusack as O'Neil (uncredited)
- Michael Hordern as Baker (uncredited)
- Jack Watson as Chief Engineer Mallicent
- Roshan Seth as Azad
- Kenneth Colley as Detective Brown
- Kenneth Cope as Bridgeman
- John Bindon as Driscoll
- Ben Aris as The Walker
- Tom Chadbon as Juggernaut's Contact
- Gareth Thomas as Liverpool Joiner
- Simon MacCorkindale as #1 Helmsman
- Andrew Bradford as Jim Hardy, 3rd Officer
- Paul Antrim as Digby
- Adam Bridge as David McCleod
- Rebecca Bridge as Nancy McCleod
- Michael Egan as Mr. Fowlers
- Freddie Fletcher as 2nd Radio Officer
- Terence Hillyer as Menzies
- Barnaby Holm as Christopher Porter
- Kristine Howarth as Mrs. Buckland
- Victor Lucas as Detective
- Paul Luty as Clerk
- David Purcell as 1st Detective
- Eric Mason as 2nd Detective
- Michael Melia as Navigator
- Doris Nolan as Mrs. Corrigan
- Liza Ross as Laura Kellogg
- Bob Sessions as Jerry Kellogg
- Colin Thatcher as Henning
- Ivy Moy-Loader as Extra

== Production ==
=== Development ===
Richard Alan Simmons's script was inspired by a real life bomb threat against the Queen Elizabeth 2 in 1972, which resulted in Special forces (one SAS, two from the Special Boat Squadron and a Welsh bomb disposal expert of the Royal Army Ordnance Corps) being parachuted into the Atlantic to board and search the liner, as dramatized in the film.

The film was the second of a three-picture deal produced by David V. Picker after he resigned as head of production for United Artists (the first was Lenny). It was made by his company, Two Roads. United Artists would distribute. In November 1973 it was reported that Bryan Forbes was to direct, with Simmons producing and Richard Harris starring, with filming set to begin in January 1974.

On 6 December 1973, it was reported that Bryan Forbes had left the project - "there were minor disagreements" claimed Picker - and been replaced by Don Medford. On 5 February 1974, it was reported that Medford, too, had left the project. He was fired by Picker who was reportedly dissatisfied with the state of the script and casting.

Picker then turned to Richard Lester, with whom he had made a number of films at United Artists, notably A Hard Day's Night. "I think Dick Lester can do any picture he sets his mind to do," said Picker. Lester was finishing work on the Musketeers films in Spain when he got a call from Denis O'Dell saying "We just fired our second director and I've got a Russian ship and we've got to leave on 18 February. Will you take it on?"

Lester was attracted to the challenge of the film, saying "It shows a government governing and I knew I should show it in thriller terms. A ship had been chartered which meant that I only had 12 days before I had to begin shooting."

On taking over the film, Lester completely rewrote the script with writer Alan Plater. "I feel I'm hired to bring something of myself to an assignment and so I rewrote much of the script," said Lester. He later elaborated:

The film did have a tight structure, it's true, but it seemed to work. What interested me was its examination of the problems of a government or that men in power would face - indeed, have faced - when something like a ship and all its passengers are held to ransom. What do you risk - lives or principles? And what principles? Of course the people in the film are mostly two-dimensional but it's not always possible to give them that third dimension in this kind of thriller.

Omar Sharif, Richard Harris and David Hemmings were already cast; Lester cast the rest. "Little casting had been done and I felt there was no need to change anyone," said Lester. He wound up filming three weeks after his original call.

"I think if I'd sat carefully and thought about it I wouldn't have done it," said Lester later. "It was very exciting. And I think that energy of getting it right carried it through. It was a wonderful experience, great fun."

The film's writer/producer, Richard Alan Simmons, was so unhappy with the reworked script that he had himself credited as Richard DeKoker on the finished film.

=== Filming ===
Filming took place in March and April 1974.

The film was shot mainly aboard the real cruise ship TS Hamburg. The German vessel had recently been sold to the Soviet Black Sea Shipping Company and renamed TS Maxim Gorkiy. Before the Soviets began operating the ship for paying passengers, the British production company chartered the ship.

Advertisements were run in British papers, soliciting extras who would take a lengthy cruise in the North Sea for free, but with the knowledge that the ship would actually seek out the worst possible weather, as the story demanded seas too rough for the lifeboats to be lowered, trapping the passengers on board. They received 2,500 applicants and had to select 250. Weather was bad; Ian Holm did not go on location but says he heard "reports of horrible storms off Iceland and everybody getting drunk to deal with it. The story was the bar closed only between seven and seven-thirty in the morning."

The ship's charter was negotiated at a set rate in February 1974, while oil prices were continuously skyrocketing due to the still-ongoing 1973 oil crisis. As a result, the Soviets, who paid the vessel's operating costs during filming, ended up losing money on the deal.

Lester says the film was scheduled for ten weeks and completed in six.

Some interior filming was completed on stages at Pinewood Studios. Location shooting was also done in and around London. A room at St Thomas' Hospital in Lambeth overlooking the River Thames doubled as the office of the managing director of the shipping line.

The movie marked the film debut of Simon MacCorkindale.

== Reception ==
=== Critical reception ===
Before the film came out Lester predicted "the critics are going to wonder where such a picture fits on to the list, what makes it a Richard Lester picture."

The New York Times called it "a movie without any style and without any characters." Stanley Kauffmann of The New Republic wrote, 'Juggernaut missed the boat, but its editing and photography were in themselves thrilling'. Pauline Kael said: "The only disaster picture that has redeemed the genre is Richard Lester’s 'Juggernaut,' which kidded the threadbare pants off the same clichés that the other pictures still try to make work."

Juggernaut holds an 80% rating on Rotten Tomatoes based on 10 reviews.

=== Box Office ===
The film was a box office disappointment. Lester thought the film was hurt by the fact people thought it was a disaster movie when "that wasn't what it was at all."

== Home media ==
The 2005 UK DVD release used the alternate title Terror on the Britannic. The film was released on Blu-ray by Kino Lorber on 9 September 2014. The film was released on Blu-ray in the UK on November 18, 2024, by Eureka Entertainment which is a limited edition of 2000 copies.

== Notes ==
- Soderbergh, Steven; Lester, Richard (1999). Getting away with it : or, The further adventures of the luckiest bastard you ever saw. Faber and Faber. p. 134. ISBN 9780571190256.
