= Day to Remember =

British Christmas television play

- Written by: Jack Rosenthal
- Directed by: Pedr James
- Starring: George Cole; Rosemary Leach
- Country of origin: United Kingdom

Production
- Producer: Humphrey Barclay
- Running time: 50 minutes
- Production company: Television South

Original release
- Network: Channel 4
- Release: 21 December 1986

Day to Remember is a British Christmas television play first transmitted 9.45pm Sunday 21 December 1986 on Channel 4 from Television South Production in association with the Theatre of Comedy Entertainment. Written by Jack Rosenthal it stars George Cole and Rosemary Leach. Again the strength of Rosenthal's comedy play lies with his closeness to the tragedy as it was based on his own experiences with his father-in-law. The pain and terror of dementia portrayed is contained and balanced by the comic presentation that beset the old. When Jack Rosenthal finally wrote his memoirs, An Autobiography in Six Acts, he did so in the form of a screenplay, including a section from Day to Remember; it was published by Robson Books in 2006.

== Plot ==
The play is set around the festive period, a season of peace and goodwill, a time for miracles. Wally (George Cole) had suffered a stroke some years back. One of the side effects is that he can't remember things, even things he said five minutes ago, or whether he's had a meal or not. Wally and his wife Hilda (Rosemary Leach) are spending Christmas with their daughter Judy and son-in-law Graham, but the peace and goodwill of the season doesn't last. An idea from Graham (a miracle) hopes to give them all a Christmas they won't forget. Throughout the play Wally repeats a rhyme out loud about his love of eating eggs, with words slightly changed each time he says it.

Wally's Poem:-

Fried eggs for my dinner,
Fried eggs for my tea,
Fried eggs in my belly,
Da-da-da-da-dee

== Cast ==
- Wally - George Cole
- Hilda - Rosemary Leach
- Judy - Barbara Flynn
- Graham - Ron Cook
