= Eskimo Day =

1996 film directed by Piers Haggard

Eskimo Day is a 1996 BBC comedy drama, written by Jack Rosenthal and directed by Piers Haggard, about the trials and tribulations of three young would-be students as they arrive with their families at Queens' College, Cambridge, on interview day. There was a sequel, Cold Enough for Snow, in 1997.

This film was Alec Guinness' final acting performance before his death in 2000.

== Cast ==
- Maureen Lipman as Shani Whittle
- David Ross as Bevis Whittle
- Benedict Sandiford as Neil Whittle
- Tom Wilkinson as Hugh Lloyd
- Laura Howard as Pippa 'Muffin' Lloyd
- Anna Carteret as Harriet Lloyd
- Alec Guinness as James
- James Fleet as Simon
- Pippa Hinchley as Bobbie the waitress
- Lila Kaye as Mother Polly

== Crew ==
- Director: Piers Haggard
- Producer: Ann Scott
- Screenplay: Jack Rosenthal
- Photography: Michael Coulter
- Editor: Michael Parker

== Reception ==
Writing for the BFI, Fintan McDonagh said: "Writer Jack Rosenthal, with characteristic flair, puts into the mouth of his actress wife the feelings of parental redundancy that he suffered after just such a trip to Cambridge with their son Adam. Not for the first time, Rosenthal was able to transform an episode from his own life into a gem of comic observation and genuine pathos."
