= Dough (film) =

- Directed by: John Goldschmidt
- Written by: Jonathan Benson; Jez Freedman
- Produced by: Wolfgang Esenwein; György Gattyán; John Goldschmidt
- Starring: Jonathan Pryce; Jerome Holder; Philip Davis; Ian Hart; Pauline Collins
- Cinematography: Peter Hannan
- Edited by: Michael Ellis
- Music by: Lorne Balfe
- Distributed by: Vertigo Films
- Release dates: 14 April 2015 (Sarasota Film Festival); 2 June 2017 (United Kingdom)
- Running time: 94 minutes
- Countries: United Kingdom; Hungary
- Language: English

Dough is a 2015 British-Hungarian stoner comedy film directed by John Goldschmidt and written by Jonathan Benson and Jez Freedman released to mixed reviews.

== Plot ==
Nat Dayan, the owner of a Jewish bakery, hires Muslim African immigrant Ayyash Habimana to work in the shop. Ayyash, who sells marijuana to support his mother, drops some into dough used for challah to hide it, but the marijuana accidentally gets mixed in, causing the challah to become popular.

== Cast ==
- Jonathan Pryce as Nat Dayan – Baker
- Jerome Holder as Ayyash Habimama – Apprentice
- Philip Davis as Sam Cotton – Competitor
- Ian Hart as Victor Gerrard – Drug dealer
- Pauline Collins as Joanna Silverman – Lady friend
- Andrew Ellis as Lucas – Friend
- Malachi Kirby as Shaun – Friend
- Natasha Gordon as Safa Habimama – Mother
- Melanie Freeman as Olivia Dayan – Granddaughter

== Reception ==
On Rotten Tomatoes, it has a score of 53% based on 60 reviews. Robbie Collin of Daily Telegraph reading; "Neither the social realism nor the stoner antics feel sufficiently thought-through, making Dough the definition of half-baked".
