= Sounding Brass (TV series) =

1980 British TV comedy series

- Genre: Comedy
- Directed by: Don Leaver; John Cooper
- Starring: Brian Glover; Gwen Taylor; Philip Jackson
- Composer: Richard Hill
- Country of origin: United Kingdom
- Original language: English
- No. of series: 1
- No. of episodes: 6

Production
- Producers: John Cooper; David Reid
- Running time: 60 minutes
- Production company: ATV

Original release
- Network: ITV
- Release: 2 July – 6 August 1980

Sounding Brass is a British comedy television series that originally aired on ITV in 1980.

Actors who appeared in individual episodes of the series include Bill Dean, Annie Hulley, Colin Douglas, Carol Leader, Barbar Bhatti, Stan Richards and Harold Innocent.

== Synopsis ==
The series concentrates on Horace Gilbert Bestwick, the new leader of the Ettaswell brass band.

== Main cast ==
- Brian Glover as Horace Gilbert Bestwick
- Gwen Taylor as Cynthia Wildgoose
- Stephen Hancock as Leonard Dukes
- Philip Jackson as Arthur Mannion
- Kevin Lloyd as Cyril Bacon
- Ray Mort as Gerry Thompson
- Mark Curry as Tim Barker
- David Huscroft as Roger Forster
- Teddy Turner as Frank Oldfield
- Alex McCrindle as Mr. Mackenzie
- Sandra Voe as Mrs. Crowther
- Deirdre Costello as Jean Gray
- Lorraine Peters as Marjorie Taylor
- Paul Shane as Gray
- Pamela Vezey as Dorothy Thompson
