= John Goldschmidt =

British-Austrian film director and producer

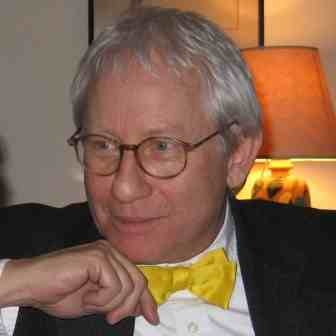
- John Goldschmidt
- Born: 1 August 1943; London, England
- Occupations: Director, Producer

John Goldschmidt (born 1 August 1943) is a British-Austrian film director and producer. Goldschmidt was born in London, but grew up in Vienna leaving at the age of 16 to return to London. Goldschmidt has both Austrian and British nationality. He went to the Gymnasium Wasagasse in Vienna and studied at the Czech National Film School and at The Royal College of Art's Department of Film and Television, where he graduated in 1968 with a Master of Arts degree.

== Life and career ==
Goldschmidt was born on 1 August 1943. He made documentary and fiction films for BBC Television, BBC Films, Granada Television, Granada Films, Associated Television, Thames Television, Channel 4, Film4 in the UK, and ZDF, Westdeutscher Rundfunk, Norddeutscher Rundfunk, Österreichischer Rundfunk, SRG SSR idée suisse, France 3, Rai 1, Bavaria Film, on the European continent, and HBO Films in the United States.

His award winning films as producer/director have included Just one Kid and It's a Lovely Day Tomorrow (writer Bernard Kops, true stories set in London's East End, Associated Television), as director Spend, Spend, Spend (starring Susan Littler, writer Jack Rosenthal, about football pools winner Viv Nicholson, BBC Television) and The Devil's Lieutenant (starring Ian Charleson and Helmut Griem, writer Jack Rosenthal, mini series set in Vienna during the last years of the Habsburg monarchy and based on the novel by Maria Fagyas, Channel 4, ZDF, Rai 1 & France 3), A Crime of Honour (aka A Song for Europe, starring David Suchet and Maria Schneider, writer Peter Prince, a true story inspired by the whistle blower Stanley Adams, Channel 4, ZDF, SRG, France 2 & RAI), Maschenka (writer John Mortimer, based on Nabokov's first novel C4 & ZDF).

Goldschmidt's award winning films as producer include Utz ( Armin Mueller-Stahl, Brenda Fricker and Paul Scofield, script by Hugh Whitemore based on novel by Bruce Chatwin) for BBC Films & NDR), Deadly Voyage starring Omar Epps, written by Stuart Urban (for HBO Pictures & BBC Films).

His television films included directing Speech Day (BBC Television), directing Vampires (writer Dixie Williams, BBC Television), executive producing Shooting Stars starring Helmut Griem (Channel 4 & ZDF), (both written by Barry Hines) and producing the mini-series Murder East, Murder West (written by Ted Whitehead, thriller set either side of the Berlin Wall, Granada Television & NDR). Goldschmidt directed She'll Be Wearing Pink Pyjamas starring Julie Walters (Film Four) and produced Captain Jack starring Bob Hoskins (writer Jack Rosenthal, Granada Films), both films had theatrical distribution. He co-produced and directed the television mini-series Nobody's Hero (Thames Television). His German language drama-documentary films as director include Egon Schiele starring Felix Mitterer (also co-writer, ORF & ZDF) and Der Narr von Wien (aka The Fool from Vienna writer Felix Mitterer, about Peter Altenberg, ORF & ZDF). His award winning music films as director include The Emperor of Atlantis (aka Der Kaiser von Atlantis, opera written in Theresienstadt concentration camp in 1943, WDR & BBC Television). His UK drama-documentaries as producer/director include Life for Christine (writer Fay Weldon, Granada Television & ZDF) and The Other Spike (dramatisation of comedian Spike Milligan's nervous breakdown, Granada).

Goldschmidt's early television documentaries include films for World in Action (Granada Television), "Bernadette Devlin" (the youngest member of the British Parliament, Associated Television), Doing her own Thing (Helen Mirren, the youngest actress at the RSC, Associated Television),The Games that Children play (LWT), The Mirror of Maigret (Georges Simenon, Associated Television), Our Live Experiment is worth more than 3,000 Textbooks (Hornsey art students rebellion, Granada Television), The Unlucky Australians (the story of the Wave Hill walk-off in Australia, featuring Frank Hardy, Associated Television), The Dead End Lads (unemployed teenagers dramatised their situation, Associated Television), Telling it like it is (Hugh Cudlipp on the state of the nation, Associated Television) and A Kind of Exile (folk singer Peggy Seeger, Associated Television). At this time, Goldschmidt was blacklisted from the BBC and his file was marked by a member of the BBC staff working for MI5.

He advised the European Union on their audiovisual policy and proposed the setting up of a European Script Fund as part of the EU's MEDIA programme. Goldschmidt's production company Viva Films was set up through an output deal for fiction films with Granada Television in London and NDR in Hamburg. Goldschmidt has been a member of both BAFTA and European Film Prize (of the European Film Academy) juries. He co-wrote (with Michael Radford) the report which proposed Channel 4's involvement in theatrical films, recently co-wrote (with Don Boyd) The Director's Guild of Great Britain's report to the British government on the UK tax credit for feature film production and has been a member of the board of Directors UK and of the Directors UK film committee.

Goldschmidt directed Dough in London and Budapest in 2015, starring Jonathan Pryce. The film was released in the US in 2016, and won several awards.

== Awards for film productions ==
- The British Academy of Film and Television Award (BAFTA) - Director,
- The Prix Italia RAI Prize - Music - Director/Writer,
- The Golden Nymph - Monte Carlo - Director,
- The Cine de Luca Award - Monte Carlo - Director,
- Fehrnsehpeis der Oestereichischen Volksbildung - Director/Writer,
- Silver Hugo - Chicago Film Festival - Director/Producer,
- Royal Television Society Award - Director,
- German Cinema Owner's Prize - Berlin Film Festival - Producer,
- The Silver Bear—Berlin Film Festival - Producer,
- Silver Nymph - Monte Carlo (twice) - Producer,
- International Emmy Award Nomination—Drama Series - Director/Producer,
- Prix Italia Prize—Nomination for Drama - Director/Producer,
- CableAce Award (US) - Nomination – Producer.
