= Bar Mitzvah Boy (musical) =

- Music: Jule Styne
- Lyrics: Don Black
- Book: Jack Rosenthal
- Basis: 1976 BBC1 teleplay Bar Mitzvah Boy
- Productions: 1978 West End; 1987 Off-Broadway

Bar Mitzvah Boy is a musical with a book by Jack Rosenthal, lyrics by Don Black, and music by Jule Styne.

Based on Rosenthal's award-winning 1976 BBC1 teleplay of the same name, it focuses on young Eliot Green who, filled with apprehension, escapes from the synagogue where he is about to make his bar mitzvah, much to the dismay of his middle class parents, who have invested their savings in a lavish party to celebrate their son's coming of age.

The West End production opened on 31 October 1978 at Her Majesty's Theatre, where it ran for 78 performances. The cast included Barry Angel, Joyce Blair, Zelah Clarke, Leonie Cosman, Ray C. Davis, Gordon Faith, Ashley Knight, Benny Lee, Barry Martin, Vivienne Martin, Harry Towb, Kerry Shale and Peter Whitman. CBS released an original cast recording. It was choreographed by Peter Gennaro and directed by Martin Charnin.

The Americanized adaptation by Martin Gottfried changed the setting from 1970s Britain to 1946 Brooklyn, but its central story remained the same.

The off-Broadway production, directed by Robert Kalfin, opened on June 10, 1987 at the American Jewish Theater of the 92nd Street Y. The cast included Peter Smith as Eliot, with Larry Keith, Mary Gutzi, Mary Stout, Michael Cone, Michael Callan, Eleanor Reissa, Daniel Marcus, Kimberly Stern, and Reuben Schafer.

A reading was held on January 26, 2007 at the Chelsea Studios, New York City, directed by Stafford Arima and featuring Faith Prince, Daniel Reichard and Peter Friedman.

In March 2016, a revival of the musical was staged Upstairs at the Gatehouse in Highgate, London.

== Song list ==
- Why?
- If Only A Little Bit Sticks
- The Bar Mitzvah of Eliot Green
- This Time Tomorrow
- Thou Shalt Not
- The Harolds Of This World
- We've Done Alright
- Simchas
- You Wouldn't Be You
- Rita's Request
- Where is the Music Coming From?
- The Sun Shines Out of Your Eyes
- I've Just Begun
