= We'll Think of Something =

- Genre: Sitcom
- Starring: Sam Kelly; Marcia Warren; Maggie Jones; Roger Sloman
- Country of origin: United Kingdom
- Original language: English
- No. of series: 1
- No. of episodes: 6

Production
- Running time: 30 minutes
- Production company: Thames Television

Original release
- Network: ITV
- Release: 1 September – 13 October 1986

We'll Think of Something is a British sitcom that aired on ITV from 1 September to 13 October 1986. Starring Sam Kelly, it was written by Geoff Rowley, who went on to write episodes of Birds of a Feather and Goodnight Sweetheart. It was made by Thames Television and was directed by John Howard Davies.

== Cast ==
- Sam Kelly as Les Brooks
- Marcia Warren as Maureen Brooks
- Maggie Jones as Irene
- Roger Sloman as Dennis
- Ray Mort as Norman
- Philip Dunbar as Eddie
- Jimmy Reddington as Dave
- John Barrard as Old Mr. Brooks
- Tariq Yunus as Dr. Khan
- Ian Bleasdale as Policeman

== Plot ==
Les Brooks is a middle-aged man who lives in Manchester and has recently been made redundant. However, he is determined not to become unemployed and join the dole queue, so he comes up with many schemes to make money, but each one fails. His wife, Maureen, has to take a job at the local pub to make ends meet. His friends include Eddie and Dennis.

== Episodes ==
1. Not Me, Pal - 1 September 1986
2. You Know Who Your Friends Are - 8 September 1986
3. What's in a Gnome - 15 September 1986
4. Business Wallah - 29 September 1986
5. Gone But Not Forgotten - 6 October 1986
6. It Comes to Us All - 13 October 1986
