= Maureen Lipman =

British actress, writer and comedian (born 1946)

Dame Maureen Lipman DBE
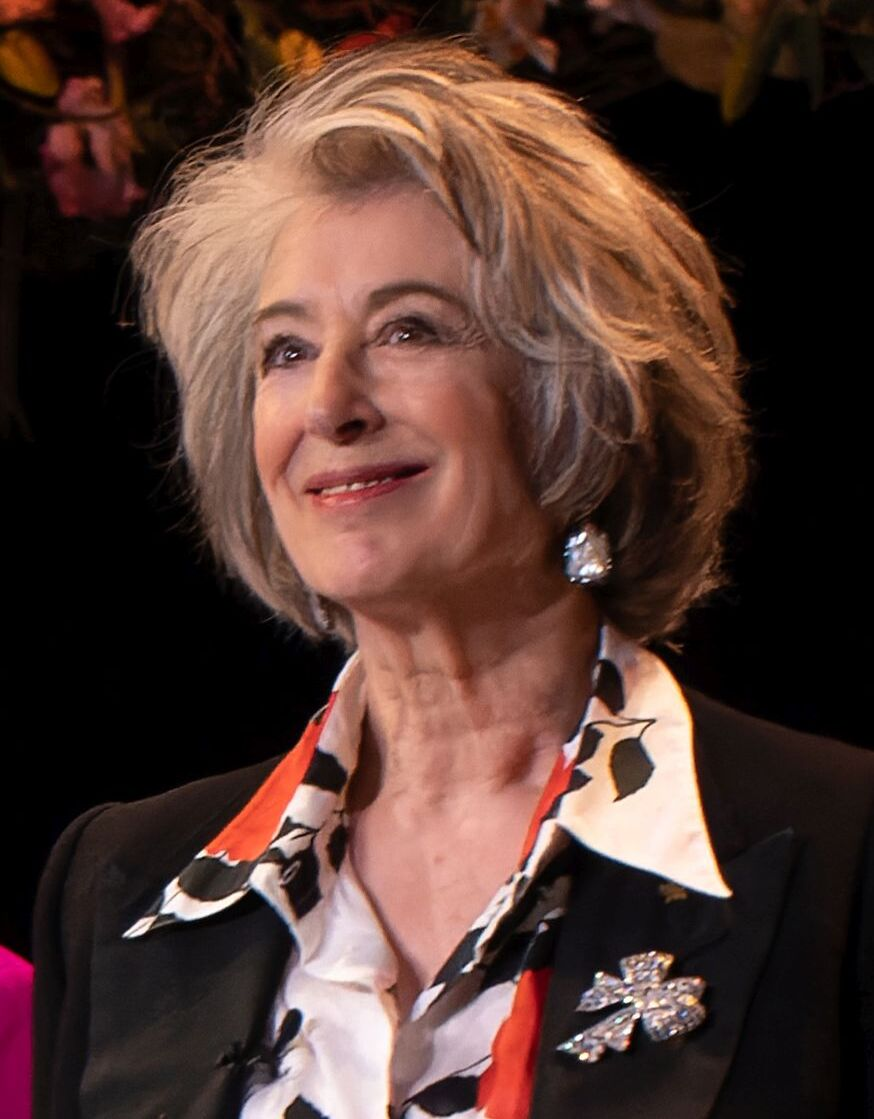
- Lipman in 2023
- Born: Maureen Diane Lipman; 10 May 1946 (age 80); Hull, England, UK
- Education: London Academy of Music and Dramatic Art
- Occupations: Actress, comedian, writer
- Years active: 1968–present
- Spouse(s): Jack Rosenthal (m. 1974; died 2004) David Turner (m. 2025)
- Partner(s): Guido Castro (2008–2021)
- Children: 2, including Amy Rosenthal

Dame Maureen Diane Turner (née Lipman; born 10 May 1946) is an English actress, comedian and columnist. She trained at the London Academy of Music and Dramatic Art and her stage work has included appearances with the Royal National Theatre and the Royal Shakespeare Company. She was made a dame in the 2020 Queen's Birthday Honours for services to charity, entertainment and the arts.

Lipman has been nominated for seven Olivier Awards across categories commending acting in plays, musicals and comedy, winning in 1984 for See How They Run. On film, Lipman was BAFTA nominated for Educating Rita (1983) and has also appeared in The Wildcats of St Trinian's (1980), Carry On Columbus (1992), Solomon & Gaenor (1999) and The Pianist (2002). On television, Lipman had prominent roles in Agony (1979–1981), Smiley's People (1982), Eskimo Day (1996) and Ladies of Letters (2009–2010). Since 2018, she has starred in Coronation Street as Evelyn Plummer.

== Early life and education ==
Lipman was born on 10 May 1946 in Kingston upon Hull, East Riding of Yorkshire, England, the daughter of Maurice Julius Lipman and Zelma Pearlman. Her father was a tailor; he used to have a shop between the Ferens Art Gallery and Monument Bridge. Lipman grew up Jewish and found post-war Hull a welcoming place for the Jewish community. She lived in Northfield Road, Hull and attended Wheeler Primary School. The family later moved to The Greenway in Anlaby Park.

Lipman later attended Newland School for Girls in Hull, and in her youth became interested in performing. She performed in school productions, attended an early Beatles concert, and watched Elizabeth Taylor's Butterfield 8 fifteen times. Her first performances at home included impersonations of Alma Cogan; "a nice Jewish girl, she was big in our house", and she was encouraged into an acting career by her mother, who used to take her to the pantomime and push her onto the stage.

Lipman trained at the London Academy of Music and Dramatic Art.

== Career ==
=== Theatre ===
Lipman worked extensively in the theatre following her début in a stage production of The Knack at the Watford Palace Theatre. In order to get the post, she pretended that a documentary producer wanted to follow her finding her first job – this was a lie but it seemed to work.

Lipman was a member of Laurence Olivier's National Theatre Company at the Old Vic from 1971 to 1973 and of the Royal Shakespeare Company for its 1973 Stratford season.

Lipman has continued to work in the theatre for more than fifty years, playing, among other roles, Aunt Eller in the National Theatre's Oklahoma!.

From November 2005 to April 2006 she played Florence Foster Jenkins in the Olivier Award-nominated show Glorious! at the Duchess Theatre in London's West End.

From October 2010 to February 2011, Lipman starred in a production of J.B. Priestley's When We Are Married at the Garrick Theatre. In 2012, she directed and appeared in a production of Barefoot in the Park on tour and starred in Old Money at Hampstead Theatre. In 2013, she starred in Daytona at the Park Theatre followed by a tour, and in 2014 a season at the Theatre Royal Haymarket. In 2015, she starred with James Dreyfus in Mary Chase's play Harvey at Birmingham Repertory Theatre, on tour and at the Theatre Royal Haymarket. In 2016, she starred in My Mother Said I Never Should at the St. James Theatre. In 2017, she starred with Felicity Kendal in a revival of Lettice and Lovage at the Menier Chocolate Factory. In 2018, she starred with Martin Shaw in The Best Man at the Playhouse Theatre, as well as returning to the Edinburgh Festival Fringe for the first time in fifty years with a one-woman show of jokes and storytelling called Up For It.

Lipman is set to appear in a special performance of Right Before I Go for World Suicide Prevention Day on 10 September 2026. Following Gerard McCarthy's withdrawal from the play over Lipman's views on the Israel–Palestine conflict, Lipman criticised the actor for being "so cowardly", claiming that McCarthy had been radicalised and described their withdrawal as "virtue-signalling".

=== Television ===
Lipman's first television role was in The Inquisitors opposite Diana Dors; other early appearances included the sitcoms The Lovers, and Doctor at Large, and a role in The Evacuees (1975). Lipman first gained prominence on television in the situation comedy Agony (1979–81), in which she played an agony aunt with a troubled private life. In her role as Stella Craven in Smiley's People (1982), Lipman appeared with Alec Guinness.

She performed the Joyce Grenfell monologue The Committee for the first time on The Green Tie on the Little Yellow Dog, which was recorded 1982, and broadcast by Channel 4 in 1983.

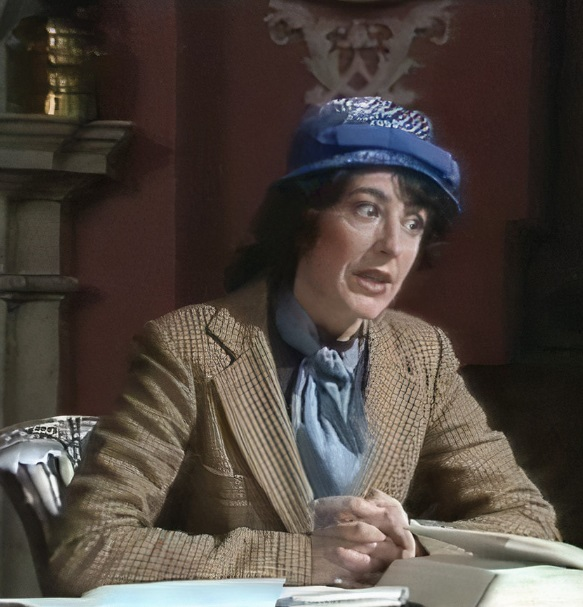
Lipman performing as Joyce Grenfell in The Green Tie on the Little Yellow Dog

She played the lead role in the television series All at No 20 (1986–87) and took on a range of diverse characters when starring in the series of comedy plays About Face (1989–91). She is known for playing Joyce Grenfell in the biographical show Re: Joyce!, which she co-wrote with James Roose-Evans.

In 1996 she appeared in the BBC comedy drama Eskimo Day, written by husband Jack Rosenthal and directed by Piers Haggard, about the trials and tribulations of three young would-be students as they arrive with their families at Queens' College, Cambridge, on interview day. There was a sequel, Cold Enough for Snow, in 1997.

She appeared as snooty landlady Lillian Spencer in Coronation Street for six episodes in 2002. The character was employed by Fred Elliott (John Savident) to run The Rovers Return Inn. She re-joined the cast of Coronation Street in August 2018, this time playing Evelyn Plummer, the long-lost grandmother of Tyrone Dobbs (Alan Halsall). During filiming for the show in November 2023, she was accompanied by a security guard due to a rise in antisemitic attacks in the UK.

In 2003 she appeared in Jonathan Creek in the episode "The Tailor's Dummy". Lipman played Maggie Wych in the children's television show The Fugitives, broadcast in 2005. She has narrated two television series on the subject of design, one for UKTV about Art Deco and one about 20th-century design for ITV/Sky Travel.

She performed as a villain, The Wire, in the 2006 series of Doctor Who in the episode entitled "The Idiot's Lantern".

She has also appeared on Just a Minute, The News Quiz, That Reminds Me, This Week and Have I Got News for You. In 2007, Lipman appeared as a celebrity contestant on Comic Relief Does The Apprentice to raise money for Comic Relief. The show saw her helping to run a funfair. Later in 2007, she made a guest appearance in Casualty; this was followed by an appearance in a December 2011 episode of the Casualty spin-off Holby City, playing a different character.

In May 2008, she appeared in the BBC documentary series Comedy Map of Britain. On Sunday 11 January 2009, BBC Four was devoted to a "Maureen Lipman Night". On 5 February 2009, she appeared in the third series of teen drama Skins, in the episode entitled "Thomas" as Pandora Moon's Aunt Elizabeth.

She played Irene Spencer in the ITV3 comedy Ladies of Letters, in which she starred alongside Anne Reid. The show's first series started in 2009, and it returned for a second series in 2010.

=== Film ===
Lipman made an early film appearance in Up the Junction (1968). In the 1983 film Educating Rita, she played the part of Trish, Rita’s sophistication flatmate who, nevertheless, attempted to take her own life with an overdose of tablets. She played the title character's mother in Roman Polanski's film The Pianist (2002). In the 1999 film Solomon & Gaenor, the character she played spoke Yiddish throughout.

=== Advertising ===
In 1987, she was cast as the character "Beatrice Bellman" ("Beatie/BT"), a Jewish grandmother in a series of television commercials for British Telecom, a role which became sufficiently well known to launch a book You Got An Ology in 1989, and which was still referred to 25 years later by politicians.

=== Books, newspapers and magazines ===
After her husband died in May 2004, she completed his autobiography By Jack Rosenthal, and played herself in her daughter's four-part adaptation of the book, Jack Rosenthal's Last Act, on BBC Radio Four in July 2006. Her anthology, The Gibbon's In Decline But The Horse Is Stable, is a book of animal poems that is illustrated by established cartoonists, including Posy Simmonds and Gerald Scarfe, to raise money for Myeloma UK, to combat the cancer to which she lost her husband.

She also wrote a monthly column for Good Housekeeping magazine for more than ten years, which formed the basis for several autobiographical books, including How Was It For You?, Something To Fall Back On, Thank You For Having Me, You Can Read Me Like A Book and Lip Reading. Lipman has also contributed a weekly column in The Guardian in the newspaper's G2 section.

She writes for The Oldie and is on the editorial advisory board of Jewish Renaissance magazine.

== Personal life ==
Lipman is a practising Jew, and a member of the West London Synagogue. Lipman has described lighting Shabbat candles before Friday-evening theatre performances.

She was married to dramatist Jack Rosenthal from 1974 until his death in 2004, and had a number of roles in his works. The couple had two children, writers Amy and Adam Rosenthal. Following Rosenthal's death, she moved from Muswell Hill, north London, to Paddington. She also has a small apartment in Manchester, where she stays when filming Coronation Street. Retired computer expert Guido Castro, an Egyptian Jew, was her partner from 2008 until his death in January 2021. In August 2024, Lipman became engaged to David Turner, co-founder of gym chain LA Fitness (now owned by PureGym). The couple were married at his home in September 2025.

== Political views ==
=== Burma ===
Lipman supports the work of the Burma Campaign UK, Europe's largest NGO regarding Myanmar (Burma). She supports the process of democratisation in the country, and the work of Prospect Burma, a non-political charity that offers Burmese students the opportunity to study at university overseas. Lipman spoke on behalf of Prospect Burma in the BBC Radio 4 Appeal, broadcast in September 2009.

=== Israel–Palestine conflict ===
Lipman supported Israel's cause during the 2006 Israel–Hezbollah conflict. On 13 July 2006, in a debate on the BBC's This Week, she argued that "human life is not cheap to the Israelis, and human life on the other side is quite cheap actually, because they strap bombs to people and send them to blow themselves up." These comments were condemned by columnist Yasmin Alibhai-Brown who said "Brutally straight, she sees no equivalence between the lives of the two tribes". Lipman responded to Alibhai-Brown's accusation of racism by arguing that the columnist had deliberately misrepresented Lipman's comments as generalisations about Muslims rather than specific comments about terrorists. Australian scholar and journalist John Pilger characterised Lipman as a "promoter of selective good causes" who is "allowed to say, without serious challenge" that human life on the other side is cheap.

In The Jewish Chronicle, Lipman argued that media reporting of the conflict was "heavily distorted":

There is rarely any film of rockets being fired into Israel, nor any mention of the damage, nor of the 250,000 refugees who have fled to the centre of Israel, nor of rockets targeting Israel every day since it withdrew from Gaza, nor the damage done by 100 Hezbollah rockets a day.
I respect freedom of speech, but I'm contemptuous of the 300 signatories [to the anti-Invasion Times advert and the Independent letter]. To English, assimilated, sometimes self-despising Jews such as Gerald Kaufman and Harold Pinter, I say: where are you going to go when the shit hits the fan? It doesn't matter if you stand in Parliament or marry into the aristocracy, there will be no Israel to receive you, as they have received so many before. Why didn't they put their ad in an Israeli newspaper? Because it is more important to impress their fellow Englishmen than to effect change in the situation. Where are their signatures against Burma, Nepal, Tibet and Zimbabwe?...

In May 2015, Lipman joined pro-Israel groups, including the Zionist Federation, in a protest against the Palestinian play The Siege in its London premiere at Battersea Arts Centre. In a 2016 interview, she ridiculed the Palestinians' "so-called" right to return, arguing that nobody "in history has ever had the right to return," and dismissed any United Nations' resolutions censuring Israel for its no-return policy, saying "This is all voted by people who don't allow women to drive and make them cover their heads with black bags."

In an interview with The Guardian on 18 August 2020, Lipman stated she would not be prepared to work alongside pro-Palestinian actors, citing Maxine Peake and Miriam Margolyes as examples.

During the Gaza war in 2024, Lipman said that protests against Israel are "close to fascism". She stated: "These bleeding, heartless liberals care so deeply for the Palestinians that they espouse their cause at the expense of every other oppressed people of the world ... Shame. Shame. Shame on every one of you."

=== Antisemitism ===
In a January 2015 interview on LBC Radio, Lipman said she was considering emigrating to the United States or Israel in response to what she perceived as increasing antisemitism in the United Kingdom. Lipman joined a November 2023 march against antisemitism in London alongside prominent celebrities including Vanessa Feltz, Robert Rinder, Tracy-Ann Oberman, Elliot Levey, Rachel Riley, Eddie Marsan, and David Baddiel.

In May 2026, the Scottish Palestine Solidarity Campaign posted an image of Lipman with devil horns and a pitchfork, alleging she had a "long record of harmful statements about Muslims, Palestinians and Palestinian rights". This was part of the group's petition calling for the cancellation of Lipman's performance in Allegra at Aberdeen. The Campaign Against Antisemitism condemned the depiction as antisemitic. As campaigners sought to disrupt performances of the play, Lipman had hired private security for her theatre tour and criticised the British government's failure to adequately address antisemitism.

=== United Kingdom politics ===
At the 2005 general election, Lipman supported the Labour Party, but declared in October 2014 that she could no longer do so due to leader Ed Miliband's support for a parliamentary motion in favour of recognising the State of Palestine. In April 2018, Lipman criticised Labour leader Jeremy Corbyn for the way he had ostensibly handled antisemitism in the Labour Party and the party's reputed failure to address the issue. Lipman attended a protest outside Labour's head office and said she was there "as a disenfranchised socialist". She identified with a placard reading "Corbyn made me a Tory". In a 2020 interview, she described herself as a "Labour luvvie" under the tenure of Tony Blair, as opposed to a "party member". She also said she would have to be "stark raving mad to support Conservative Party leader Boris Johnson". However, in July 2026, she announced that she supports Kemi Badenoch and is considering voting for the Conservative Party.

== Acting credits ==
=== Film ===
Year	Title	Role	Notes
1968	Up the Junction	Sylvie	
1969	The Smashing Bird I Used to Know	Sarah	AKA, School for Unclaimed Girls
1971	Gumshoe	Naomi	
1980	The Wildcats of St Trinian's	Katy Higgs	
1983	Educating Rita	Trish	
1985	Water	Margaret Thatcher	
1985	National Lampoon's European Vacation	Lady in the bed	
1992	Carry On Columbus	Countess Esmeralda	
1999	Solomon & Gaenor	Rezl	
1999	Captain Jack	Barbara Bostock	
2002	The Pianist	Edwarda Szpilman	
2003	SuperTex	Dora Breslauer	
2004	Lighthouse Hill	Audrey Davidson	
2008	The Agent	Charlie	
2008	Caught in the Act	Judith Herbst	
2012	Run for Your Wife	Exercising woman	Cameo
2012	Metamorphosis	Mrs. Samsa	
2020	The Schnoz	Norma & Golda	Short film
2024	Our Neighbour's Ass	Ida Schumacher	Short film
2025	The Dog That Couldn't Bark	Rebecca	Short film
2025	Every Day's A Bonus	Jean	Short film

=== Television ===
Year	Title	Role	Notes
1968	The Inquisitors	Magda Barcelona	Episode: "The Peeling of Sweet Pea"
1969–1970, 1981	ITV Playhouse	Liz; Little Satin Bottom/The Mayoress; Zoya Krein	Episodes: "In a Cottage Hospital", "The People's Jack", "Last Night Another Dissident..."
1969–1970, 1973	ITV Sunday Night Theatre	Joanna Dibble; Barbara; Cathleen	Episodes: "It's Called the Sugar Plum", "The Gingham Dog", "Long Day's Journey Into Night"
1970	Codename	Lisa	Episode: "A Walk with the Lions"
1970	Don't Ask Us – We're New Here	Various	TV series
1970	The Lovers	Sandra Appleton	Episode: "Brainwashing"
1971	Doctor at Large	Maxine	Episode: "Saturday Matinee"
1973	Thriller	Liz Morris	Episode: "File It Under Fear"
1973	Casanova '73	Gloria	Episode #1.3
1973–1975	Crown Court	Sarah Lewis	Recurring role
1974	Armchair Cinema	Annie	Episode: "Regan"
1974	You'll Never Walk Alone	Marjorie Pouncey	TV short
1975	The Evacuees	Sarah Miller	TV film
1975	Three Comedies of Marriage	Rachel	Episode: "Bobby Bluesocks"
1975–1976	Couples	Marian Steinberg	Main role
1976	The Sweeney	Mrs. Smedley	Episode: "Selected Target"
1976	Rogue Male	Freda	TV film
1978	A Soft Touch	Alison Holmes	TV series
1978	Play for Today	Sharon Benson	Episode: "Dinner at the Sporting Club"
1979	The Cannon and Ball Show	Mrs. Paige	Episode #1.2
1979	The Knowledge	Brenda Weller	TV film
1979–1981	Agony	Jane Lucas	Main role
1981	The Other 'Arf	Margaret Thatcher (voice)	Episode: "Away from It All"
1981	Dangerous Davies – The Last Detective	Ena Lind	TV film
1982	Jackanory	Witch	Episode: "The Witching Hour"
1982	Smiley's People	Stella Craven	TV mini-series
1982	Objects of Affection	Val	Episode: "Rolling Home"
1982	Outside Edge	Maggie	TV film
1983	The Green Tie on the Little Yellow Dog	Joyce Grenfell	TV film
1984	See How They Run	Miss Skillon	TV film
1985	On Your Way, Riley	Kitty McShane	TV film
1985	Love's Labour's Lost	The Princess of France	TV film
1985	Victoria Wood: As Seen on TV	Ruth	Episode #1.5
1985	Theatre Night	Marge	Episode: "Absent Friends"
1985	Absurd Person Singular	Jane Hopcroft	TV film
1986	Screenplay	Julie	Episode: "Shift Work"
1986–1987	All at No 20	Sheila Haddon	TV series
1987	A Little Princess	Miss Minchin	TV mini-series
1987	First Sight	Tamara	Episode: "Exclusive Yarns"
1989–1991	About Face	Various	Main role
1991	Re:Joyce! – A Celebration of the Work of Joyce Grenfell	Joyce Grenfell	TV film
1992	Bookmark	Enid Blyton	Episode: "Sunny Stories"
1995	Call up the Stars	Joyce Grenfell	TV film
1995	Agony Again	Jane Lucas	Main role
1996	Eskimo Day	Shani Whittle	TV film
1997	Cold Enough for Snow	Shani Whittle	TV film
1999	Oklahoma!	Aunt Eller	TV film
2002	George Eliot: A Scandalous Life	Narrator	TV film
2002	Coronation Street	Lillian Spencer	Guest role, 6 episodes
2003	Jonathan Creek	Louise Bergman	Episode: "The Tailor's Dummy"
2003	Winter Solstice	Marcia	TV film
2004	Where the Heart Is	Stella Sinclair	Episode: "Body & Soul"
2005	The Fugitives	Maggie Wynch	Recurring role
2006	Doctor Who	The Wire	Episode: "The Idiot's Lantern"
2007	Sensitive Skin	Sue Shortstop	Episodes: "Three Lost Loves", "Here I Am"
2007	Casualty	Hannah 'Hayley' Liddell	Episode: "Behind Closed Doors"
2008	He Kills Coppers	Lily Porter	TV film
2009	Skins	Aunt Elizabeth	Episode: "Thomas"
2009	Minder	Anita Richardson	Episode: "The Art of the Matter"
2009–2010	Ladies of Letters	Irene Spencer	Main role
2011	Tinga Tinga Tales	Hummingbird (voice)	Episode: "Why Hummingbird Hums"
2011	Holby City	Bonnie Walters	Episode: "Half Empty"
2012	Midsomer Murders	Mags Dormer	Episode: "Written in the Stars"
2015	The Vicar of Dibley	Alicia	Episode: "Comic Relief Special 2015"
2015	Bull	Beverley Bull	Main role
2015	The Job Lot	Maggie Higgins	Episode #3.6
2016–2019	Plebs	Landlady	Recurring role (series 3–5)
2016	The Crystal Maze	Mumsey	Episode: "SU2C Special"
2018–2025	Coronation Street	Evelyn Plummer	Main cast
2021	Rose	Rose	TV film
2026	Father Brown	Patricia Parkinson	Episode: "The Palace by the Sea"

=== Theatre ===
Selected.

Year	Title	Role	Notes
1971	Tyger	Performer	New Theatre, London
1979	Outside Edge	Maggie	Queen's Theatre, London
1983	On Your Way, Riley	Kitty McShane	The Queen's Theatre
1984	See How They Run	Miss Skillon	Shaftesbury Theatre, West End
1986	Wonderful Town	Ruth Sherwood	Queen's Theatre, London
1991-1992	The Cabinet Minister	Lady Kitty Twombley	UK Tour
1992-1993	Lost in Yonkers	Bella	UK Tour
1993-1994	Re: Joyce!	Joyce Grenfell	UK Tour
1994	The Sisters Rosensweig	Gorgeous Teitelbaum	The Old Vic, London
1998	Oklahoma!	Aunt Eller	Royal National Theatre, London
1999-2000	Peggy for You	Peggy Ramsay	Harold Pinter Theatre, West End
2003	Thoroughly Modern Mille	Mrs Meers	Shaftesbury Theatre, West End
2005	Glorious!	Florence Foster Jenkins	Duchess Theatre, West End
2008	The Cherry Orchard	Charlotta Ivanovna	Chichester Festival Theatre, Chichester
2010	A Little Night Music	Madame Armfeldt	Garrick Theatre, West End
2010	When We Are Married	Clara Soppitt	Garrick Theatre, West End
2012	Barefoot in the Park	Mrs. Banks	UK Tour
2012	Old Money	Joyce	Hampstead Theatre, London
2014	Daytona	Elli	Park Theatre, London
2015	Harvey	Veta	Birmingham Repertory Theatre, London
2016	My Mother Said I Never Should	Doris	St. James Theatre, London
2017	Lettice and Lovage	Lotte	Menier Chocolate Factory, London
2018	The Best Man	Mrs Gamadge	Playhouse Theatre, West End
2023	Rose	Rose	Ambassadors Theatre, West End
2026	Allegra	Allegra	UK Tour

== Publications ==
- How Was It For You? Home thoughts from a broad, Little Brown, 1986. ISBN 978-0708831335
- Something to Fall Back On...and other pretty colourful material, Robson Books, 1987. ISBN 978-0860514503
- (with Richard Philips)You Got An Ology?, Robson Books, 1989. ISBN 978-0860515982
- Thank You For Having Me, Robson Books, 1990. ISBN 978-0860516798
- When's It Coming Out, Robson Books, 1992. ISBN 978-0860518174
- You Can Read Me Like A Book, Robson Books, 1995. ISBN 978-0860519799
- Lip Reading, Robson Books, 1999. ISBN 978-1861052896
- The Gibbon's in Decline But the Horse is Stable..., Robson Books, 2006. ISBN 978-1861059697
- Past-it Notes, Gardners Books, 2008. ISBN 978-1845799915
- I Must Collect Myself: Choice Cuts From a Long Shelf-Life, Simon & Schuster, 2010. ISBN 978-1847373489
- It's a Jungle Out There: A Lipman-Agerie, Biteback Publishing, 2016. ISBN 978-1785900969

== Awards and nominations ==
- In 1994, Lipman was awarded an honorary doctorate by the University of Hull.

Year	Awards	Category	Nominated work	Result	Ref.
1979	Laurence Olivier Awards	Best Comedy Performance	Outside Edge	Nominated	
1981	British Academy Television Awards	Best Light Entertainment Performance	Agony	Nominated	
1983	British Academy Television Awards	Best Actress	Outside Edge / Rolling Home	Nominated	
1983	Laurence Olivier Awards	Actress of the Year in a New Play	Messiah	Nominated	
1984	British Academy Film Awards	Best Actress in a Supporting Role	Educating Rita	Nominated	
1984	Laurence Olivier Awards	Best Comedy Performance	See How They Run	Won	
1986	Laurence Olivier Awards	Best Actress in a Musical	Wonderful Town	Nominated	
1998	Laurence Olivier Awards	Best Family Show	Maureen Lipman, Live and Kicking	Nominated	
2003	Polish Film Award	Best Supporting Actress	The Pianist	Nominated	
2004	Laurence Olivier Awards	Best Actress in a Musical	Thoroughly Modern Millie	Nominated	
2010	Laurence Olivier Awards	Best Actress in a Supporting Role in a Musical	A Little Night Music	Nominated	
2019	Inside Soap Awards	Best Newcomer	Coronation Street	Won	
2021	Inside Soap Awards	Funniest Performance	Coronation Street	Won	
2022	Inside Soap Awards	Best Comic Performance	Coronation Street	Won	
2023	Inside Soap Awards	Best Comic Performance	Coronation Street	Won	
2023	Inside Soap Awards	Best Partnership	Coronation Street	Nominated	
2023	The British Soap Awards	Best Comedy Performance	Coronation Street	Won	
2023	The British Soap Awards	Best On-Screen Partnership	Coronation Street	Nominated	
2024	Inside Soap Awards	Best Comic Performance	Coronation Street	Won	
2024	TV Choice Awards	Best Soap Actress	Coronation Street	Won	
2025	International Festival of Cinema	Best Actress - Short	Every Day's A Bonus	Nominated	

== Honours ==
Lipman was appointed Commander of the Order of the British Empire (CBE) in the 1999 New Year Honours and Dame Commander of the Order of the British Empire (DBE) in the 2020 Birthday Honours for services to charity, entertainment and the arts. Accompanied by her son, Adam Rosenthal, she received her award from Charles, Prince of Wales at Windsor Castle on 28 October 2021.

== Legacy ==
Her papers, and those of her husband Jack Rosenthal, are held at the University of Sheffield.
