= Peter Eade =

English theatrical agent (1919–1979)

Peter John Aylmer Eade (11 March 1919 – 25 April 1979) was an English theatrical agent best known for his representation of individuals such as Kenneth Williams, Ronnie Barker, and Joan Sims.

Eade died in Ropley, Hampshire in 1979, aged 60. In the 2006 BBC television film Kenneth Williams: Fantabulosa!, about the life of Williams, Eade was portrayed by Ron Cook.
