= Spend, Spend, Spend =

- Play for Today episode
- Episode no.: Series 7 Episode 12
- Directed by: John Goldschmidt
- Written by: Jack Rosenthal
- Original air date: 15 March 1977

Episode chronology
← Previous "Do As I Say"	Next → "A Photograph"

"Spend, Spend, Spend" is the 12th episode of seventh season of the British BBC anthology TV series Play for Today. The episode was a television play that was originally broadcast on 15 March 1977. "Spend, Spend, Spend" was written by Jack Rosenthal, directed by John Goldschmidt, produced by Graeme McDonald, and starred Susan Littler and John Duttine.

The play is based on the book of the same name by Nicholson and Stephen Smith and recounts Vivian Nicholson's life story from the 1950s to the early 1970s in a non-linear fashion.

== Development ==
Rosenthal was a colleague of the PR man who, on behalf of Littlewoods Pools, persuaded Nicholson to allow publicity for her pools win. He wrote in his autobiography: "From that day on, I followed her wild, seemingly stupid adventures in the papers - and believed every snide, snooty, biased word the relentless publicity said. All adding up to one word - that she was a cow." Being given Nicholson's book by director John Goldschmidt caused Rosenthal to reassess his attitude and "become a fan" eager to put across an explanation of her behaviour.

== Critical response ==
The production won the British Academy Television Awards for Best Single Play and Royal Television Society's Writer's Award 1977.

== Home media ==
The work was released on DVD as part of Jack Rosenthal at the BBC by Acorn media in 2011, alongside other works for television written by Rosenthal.
