= Anlaby Park =

Suburb of Kingston upon Hull, East Riding of Yorkshire, England

Coordinates: 53.741°N 0.410°W

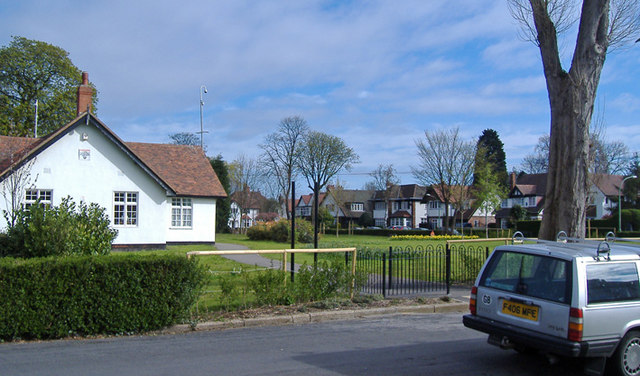
Anlaby Park green and library

Anlaby Park is a small suburb just to the west of the city centre of Kingston upon Hull, England. The area is sandwiched between the B1231 Anlaby Road to the north, and the A1105 Boothferry Road to the south. Anlaby Park is represented by three unitary authority wards (Tranby, Boothferry, and Pickering), and is represented at Westminster as part of the Kingston upon Hull and Haltemprice constituency.

A library was established in Anlaby park in 1964, and then in 2013 threatened with closure. It later reopened as a community-run library. Anlaby Park conservation area was created in 1994.

== Notable people ==
- Maureen Lipman resided in The Greenway in the 1960s, after moving from Northfield Road, Hull.
