= Crime Buster (TV series) =

1968 UK television series

- Genre: Crime drama
- Starring: Mark Eden
- Country of origin: United Kingdom
- Original language: English
- No. of series: 1
- No. of episodes: 13

Original release
- Network: ITV
- Release: 8 August – 31 October 1968

Crime Buster is a 1968 British crime drama television series made by Associated Television. The series starred Mark Eden as Ray Saxon, a newspaper columnist with the Sunday Globe and a former champion cyclist, who investigates and exposes sports racketeers. Other regulars on the series included Ray Mort as Jimmy Vine and Sonia Graham as Madge Raynor. The series only ran for one series with a total of 13 episodes which aired from 8 August 1968 through 31 October 1968. Occasionally the program would feature real athletes and other sports figures like broadcaster John Rickman in episodes.
