= Another Sunday and Sweet F.A. =

1972 ITV Sunday Night Theatre episode

- ITV Sunday Night Theatre episode
- Episode no.: Series 4 Episode 12
- Directed by: Michael Apted
- Written by: Jack Rosenthal
- Original air date: 9 January 1972

"Another Sunday and Sweet F.A." is a television play written by Jack Rosenthal and directed by Michael Apted for Granada Television and which was first broadcast on 9 January 1972 in the ITV Sunday Night Theatre strand. It stars David Swift, Freddie Fletcher and Gordon McGrase. It also features Anne Kirkbride, who as a result of her performance was cast in Coronation Street in the role of Deirdre Barlow.

The play won the TV Critics' Circle Best Play of the Year Award.

== Plot ==
Eric Armistead (David Swift) is a Sunday league association football referee. Rosenthal explained that for him "life is an Immorality Play. Right never triumphs over wrong. Good never vanquishes evil. No one knows the meaning of 'fairness'. Which is why he's a Sunday morning referee – hoping that in his own small way, in a foreign field that's forever Manchester, he and his whistle might change the world." He referees a match between Sunday league teams Parker Street Depot XI and Co-Op Albion XI, but the game is ugly and violent, and it ends with the referee, driven to exasperation by the players, heading the ball into the net for the winning goal.

== Cast ==
- David Swift as Eric Armistead
- Gordon McGrae as Parker Street captain
- Fred Feast as Parker Street coach
- Freddie Fletcher as Albion captain
- Duggie Brown as Albion Coach
- Bert King as Albion Linesman
- David Bradley as Goalie
- Joe Gladwin as Sam
- Michael de Frayne as Norman
- Susan Littler as Jeannie
- Clare Kelly as Gwen
- Lynne Carol as Woman with Dog
- Anne Kirkbride and Clare Sutcliffe as players' girlfriends
- Alan Erasmus and Stephen Bent as Parker Street players
- Roy Nield, Joey Kaye and John Procter as Albion players
- Bruce Watt, Brian Sweeney and Dominic Toner as Boys

== Critical reaction ==
At the time of broadcast, Chris Dunkley in The Times was critical calling it "not a bad play" that "failed continually to live up to a feeling of promise, and a hint of something better to come". However, Dunkley praised Swift's performance in what was "an unusual part for any actor".

Later appraisals have been more favourable. Peter Sharkey in 2005 called it "possibly the greatest dramatic portrayal of football ever seen on our screens", praising details like players arriving clutching cigarettes and the goalkeeper arguing with his girlfriend as he leans against the posts, as well as the atmosphere of alcohol and bad pitches.

The BFI website says "Not much happens ... but the accumulation of detail exudes authenticity." Leslie Halliwell in his Teleguide (1979) calls it an "amusing north-country comedy".

It is held in high esteem by specialist sports writers. Frank Keating called it a "classic" of sport-themed drama. Peter Seddon of The Times included in his list of ten classic football dramas.

== DVD ==
It was included in the 2006 DVD box set Jack Rosenthal at ITV.
