= Queenie's Castle =

British TV sitcom (1970–1972)

- Main cast
- Genre: Sitcom
- Written by: Keith Waterhouse; Willis Hall
- Starring: Diana Dors; Freddie Fletcher; Brian Marshall; Barrie Rutter; Tony Caunter; Lynne Perrie; Bryan Mosley
- Theme music composer: Cliff Twemlow
- Opening theme: "The Greatest Show on Earth"
- Country of origin: United Kingdom
- Original language: English
- No. of series: 3
- No. of episodes: 18

Production
- Producers: Graham Evans (Series 1); Ian Davidson (Series 2-3)
- Editor: Tim Ritson
- Production company: Yorkshire Television

Original release
- Network: ITV
- Release: 5 November 1970 – 5 September 1972

Queenie's Castle is a British sitcom set in early 1970s Leeds, West Yorkshire. The series was made for the ITV by Yorkshire Television and aired from 1970 to 1972. The series starred British actress Diana Dors.

== Plot ==
Starring Diana Dors as the eponymous Queenie Shepherd, the series revolved around the lives and, often illegal, activities of the residents of a Social Housing Development in early 1970s Leeds, West Yorkshire. Queenie's husband Lionel never appears, leaving the neighbours and viewers alike to assume he is in prison. Various excuses are made, such as "He's working on the motorway in Carlisle", but this changed throughout the series.

Queenie shared her flat with four men: her shady brother-in-law Jack, and her sons, labourer Raymond, van driver Bunny, and the unemployed Douglas.

The family's archenemy, Mrs Petty, lives on a ground floor flat and runs a cake shop in a row of shops at the bottom of the flats. Mrs Petty's main friend is Mrs Blakely, who also dislikes the Shepherds. Although Mrs Petty is seen to live in a ground floor flat, and this is made obvious throughout the series, on more than one occasion she claims to live next door to the Shepherds, who clearly live several floors up.

== Production ==
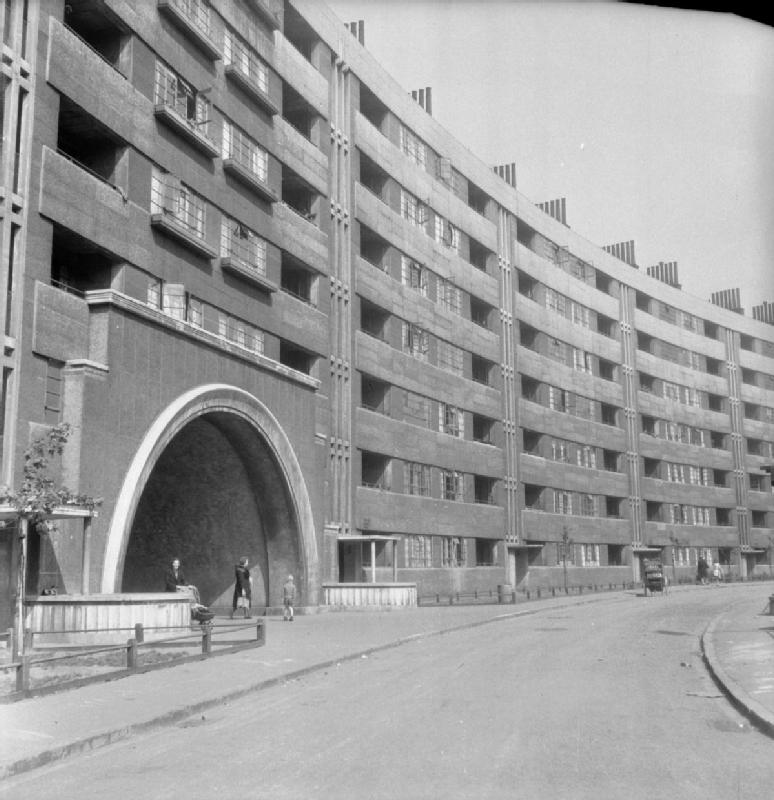
The Quarry Hill flats were the setting for Queenie's Castle

Produced by Yorkshire Television, the scripts were written by Keith Waterhouse (author of Billy Liar) and Willis Hall. The remaining four episodes of series one were recorded in black and white due to the ITV colour strike.

Although the location was unspecified on screen, parts of the series were filmed in Quarry Hill, Leeds. The council flats, where it was filmed have since been demolished. They were notable as the first council flats of their kind, built in art deco style in the 1930s.

== Cast ==
- Diana Dors – Queenie Shepherd
- Freddie Fletcher – Raymond Herbert Shepherd
- Brian Marshall – Bernard Anthony "Bunny" Shepherd
- Barrie Rutter – Douglas Fairbanks Shepherd
- Tony Caunter – Jack Henry Shepherd
- Lynne Perrie – Mrs Edith Petty
- Bryan Mosley – Jeremy, the landlord
- Kathy Staff – Mrs Blakely

== Episodes ==
Series 1

- We Humbly Beseech (5 November 1970)
- The Great Debate (12 November 1970)
- They Also Served (19 November 1970)
- Just Good Friends (26 November 1970)
- Trial By Fury (3 December 1970)
- Unaccustomed As I Am (10 December 1970)

Note: episodes three to six of series 1 were shown in black-and-white due to the ITV Colour Strike.

Series 2

- Sweetness And Light (3 June 1971)
- The Ladykillers (10 June 1971)
- The Breadwinner (17 June 1971)
- Industrial Relations (24 June 1971)
- On The Wagon (1 July 1971)
- Castles in the Air (8 July 1971)

Series 3

- The Prowler (1 August 1972)
- New Broom (8 August 1972)
- The One That Got Away (15 August 1972)
- England Expects (22 August 1972)
- Mr Faintheart (29 August 1972)
- The Patter of Tiny Feet (5 September 1972)

== Reception ==
According to the BFI, "Dors proved so popular as the brassy Queenie that after the third and final series, she and Caunter essentially reprised their characters under different names for the rugby league sitcom All Our Saturdays (ITV, 1973)."

== DVD releases ==
All three series of Queenie's Castle were released (separately) by Simply Media in May 2009. Network released a three-disc box set of the complete series in August 2009.

DVD	Year(s)	Release date
The Complete Series 1	1970	18 May 2009
The Complete Series 2	1971	18 May 2009
The Complete Series 3	1972	18 May 2009
The Complete Series 1 to 3 (box set)	1970- 1972	10 Aug 2009
