= North London Hospice =

Charitable hospice in North London providing multi-faith end-of-life care

- Abbreviation: NLH
- Formation: 1984
- Type: Charity
- Purpose: Hospice care to patients with life-limiting illnesses
- Location(s): Finchley and Enfield

The North London Hospice (NLH) is a registered charity in London, United Kingdom, providing hospice care to patients with life-limiting and terminal illnesses. It was founded in 1984 in response to the lack of aftercare for patients being discharged from hospital in North London following the closure of St. Columbus Hospital in 1981, which had been north London's only long-stay hospital.

The North London Hospice was the United Kingdom's first multi-faith hospice. It has been described in The Guardian as "a place of peace and beauty with rooms full of natural light opening on to gardens and a central courtyard full of plants".

It provides specialist palliative and end-of-life care to people within the boroughs of Barnet, Enfield and Haringey. Most care is provided to people at home. Otherwise, care takes place at its Finchley in-patient unit, which was opened in 1992, and its Health & Wellbeing Centre in Winchmore Hill.

The hospice's 1985 building was "built on a very minimal construction budget in comparison to other hospices of similar size and scope of services". Renovation took place in 2002.
