= Jack Rosenthal =

English playwright (1931–2004)

Jack Rosenthal CBE
- Born: 8 September 1931; Cheetham Hill, Manchester, England
- Died: 29 May 2004 (aged 72); Barnet, London, England
- Education: University of Sheffield
- Occupations: Screenwriter, playwright
- Spouses: Catherine Ward (m. 1964; div. 1966) Maureen Lipman (m. 1973)
- Children: 2, including Amy
- Writing career
- Notable awards: CBE, BAFTA

Jack Morris Rosenthal (8 September 1931 – 29 May 2004) was an English playwright. He wrote 129 early episodes of the ITV soap opera Coronation Street and over 150 screenplays, including original television plays, feature films, and adaptations.

== Early life ==
Jack Morris Rosenthal was born into a Jewish family on 8 September 1931 in Cheetham, Manchester. He was the younger of two sons to father Sam, a raincoat factory worker, and mother Leah (née Miller) Rosenthal. His parents were married in 1927 in Manchester, and were children of Russian Jewish immigrants.

Rosenthal attended the Manchester Jews School in Derby Street, Cheetham. During the Second World War, he was evacuated to Blackpool, Lancashire with an inhospitable family who censored his letters and confiscated his food parcels. His family subsequently moved to Colne, Lancashire, and Rosenthal attended Colne Grammar School. In 1953, after studying English Literature at Sheffield University, he carried out his national service in the Royal Navy as a Russian translator.

== Career ==
Rosenthal worked briefly in advertising before joining Granada Television in 1956. He earned his first television credit with Granada in 1961, assigned as a writer of episode 31 of what would become Britain's longest-running soap opera, Coronation Street. Rosenthal became a regular writer for the series and, in addition, began writing for other series. During the 1960s, he contributed material for various television comedy shows, including the satirical That Was The Week That Was. At Granada Television, he wrote a Coronation Street spin-off series for the character Leonard Swindley, played by Arthur Lowe, called Pardon the Expression. Rosenthal also created two comedy series, The Dustbinmen and The Lovers, the latter starring Richard Beckinsale and Paula Wilcox. In 1976, he wrote a drama for ITV, Ready When You Are, Mr McGill, which was remade in 2003.

Rosenthal won three BAFTA awards for Bar Mitzvah Boy (about a Jewish boy's bar mitzvah), The Evacuees (based on his own war-time evacuation) and Spend, Spend, Spend (about the football pools winner, Viv Nicholson, directed by John Goldschmidt). He also wrote The Knowledge, a film about London taxi-drivers which has become a classic for cabbies-in-training. He wrote the 1986 television film London's Burning for London Weekend Television, which proved so successful that it was adapted into a television series of the same name, which ran from 1988 until 2002. Rosenthal adapted the novel The Devil's Lieutenant for director John Goldschmidt as a mini-series for Channel 4 and ZDF. He also wrote the screenplay for the 1998 Captain Jack (based on a true story) for Goldschmidt as producer.

In 1983, Rosenthal co-wrote the film Yentl with Barbra Streisand. He also did uncredited work on the screenplay of Chicken Run, and wrote the book for the musical version of Bar Mitzvah Boy, with music by Jule Styne.

== Personal life and death ==
On 23 February 1964, Rosenthal married model Catherine Ward in Blackpool, Lancashire; two years later, the marriage ended in divorce. Rosenthal met actress Maureen Lipman in 1969 in a pub in Manchester while Rosenthal was writing for Coronation Street. He married Lipman on 18 February 1973 in Marylebone, London; they had two children, writers Amy and Adam Rosenthal, and lived in a large house in Muswell Hill, north London.

Rosenthal was a lifelong Manchester United fan, listing his recreations in Who's Who as "checking Manchester United's score, minute by minute, on teletext".

In 2002, Rosenthal was diagnosed with multiple myeloma, a form of blood cancer. He died on 29 May 2004 at the North London Hospice in Barnet, north London, aged 72. He is buried in Golders Green Jewish Cemetery. Rosenthal's estate was valued at £1.3 million; he left a legacy to The Ravenswood Foundation, West London Synagogue, Jewish Care, Manchester Jewish Museum, Nightingale House and the North London Hospice.

== Honours ==
Rosenthal was appointed CBE in 1994, for services to drama. He received four honorary degrees from northern universities including an honorary doctorate from Sheffield University in 1998 and a degree from Manchester Metropolitan University in 2002.

== Legacy ==
Rosenthal's autobiography, By Jack Rosenthal, was published posthumously, and a four-part adaptation by his daughter, titled Jack Rosenthal's Last Act was broadcast on BBC Radio 4 in July 2006, starring Maureen Lipman as herself and Stephen Mangan as Rosenthal.

As part of the regeneration of the First Street district in Manchester, a street was named after him, Jack Rosenthal Street, unveiled by his widow in May 2015, next to HOME, a centre of contemporary art, theatre and film.

== Writing credits ==
=== Television ===
- Coronation Street (1961–1969)
- Bulldog Breed (1962)
- Bootsie and Snudge (1963)
- Pardon the Expression (1965–1966)
- Mrs Thursday – You Don't Have to Book Buckingham Palace (1966)
- The Night Before the Morning After (1966)
- Compensation Alice (1967)
- Your Name's Not God, It's Edgar (1968)
- There's a Hole in Your Dustbin, Delilah (1968)
- The Dustbinmen (1969–1970)
- The Lovers (1970–1971)
- Another Sunday and Sweet F.A. (1972)
- And for My Next Trick (1972)
- Village Hall (1974)
- Hot Fat (1974)
- The Evacuees (1975)
- Sadie, It's Cold Outside (1975)
- Ready When You Are, Mr McGill (1976)
- The Five Pound Orange (1976)
- Well Thank You, Thursday (1976)
- Amazing Stories (1976)
- Matchfit (1976)
- Bag of Yeast (1976)
- Bar Mitzvah Boy (1976)
- Spaghetti Two-Step (1977)
- Spend, Spend, Spend (1977)
- The Knowledge (1979)
- The Devil's Lieutenant (1983)
- Mrs Capper's Birthday (1985)
- The Fools on the Hill (1986)
- London's Burning (1986)
- Day To Remember (1986)
- And a Nightingale Sang (1989)
- About Face (1989–1991)
- Bye Bye Baby (1992)
- Wide-Eyed and Legless (1993)
- Moving Story (1994–1995)
- Eskimo Day (1996)
- Cold Enough for Snow (1997)
- Lucky Jim (2003)
- Ready When You Are, Mr McGill (2003)

=== Screenplays ===
- The Lucky Star (1980)
- P'tang, Yang, Kipperbang (1982)
- Experience Preferred... But Not Essential (1982)
- Yentl (1983)
- The Chain (1984)
- Captain Jack (1999)
- Chicken Run (2000)

=== Stage ===
- Bar Mitzvah Boy (musical) (1978)
- Smash! (1981)
- Dear Anyone (musical) (1983)
- Our Gracie (1984)
- Dreyfus (2000)
