= Amanda-Jane Manning =

English actress and singer

- Born: 29 May 1979 (age 46); North West London, United Kingdom
- Occupation: Actress
- Years active: 1989–present
- Children: Isabella Anne Manning
- Website: www.amandajmanning.com

Amanda-Jane Manning (born 29 May 1979) is an English actress, singer and recording artist. She is best known for her appearances in various musical theatre shows in the West End, Germany, across Europe and the United States. She also appears as a solo artist on Petula Clark's Album In Her Own Write singing "My Love Will Never Die" for Sepia Records in 2007.

== Biography ==
At the age of seven, she won a place at the Sylvia Young Theatre School. At 11 she auditioned and won a place at the junior school of Italia Conti Academy of Theatre Arts, as well as in the Performing Arts course until the age of 19.

== Musical theatre career ==
After graduating from Italia Conti Academy in 1998–1999, Manning toured the UK as a phantom understudying the lead role of Janet Weiss [13] in The Rocky Horror Show directed by Christopher Malcolm with Jason Donovan and Ross King as Frank n Furter, Laurie Brett and Majenta and Nicholas Parsons as the narrator for 18 months. The show later transferred to the West End in April 1999 at the Victoria Palace Theatre. In September 1999, Manning continued touring with The Rocky Horror Show with actor Darren Day playing the role of Frank n Furter. She also appeared with the show at the Royal Albert Hall in a concert for Stonewall organised by actor Michael Cashman, who was playing the role of the narrator in the show.

Manning also appears on the Cast Album The Rocky Horror Show. In 2001 she appeared in Spend Spend Spend understudying the lead role of 1960's football pools winner Viv Nicholson at the English Theatre in Frankfurt, Germany. In 2002 she was invited to star as Janet Weiss in the European Tour of The Rocky Horror Show. In 2003 she played the leader of the pink ladies "Rizzo" in Grease, alongside Noel Sullivan as Danny and Clare Buckfield as Sandy at the Jersey Opera House.

In October 2007, Manning worked in Los Angeles alongside Brad Ellis who is the musical director for Glee and writer of Forbidden Broadway, Michael Kostroff (Les Misérables, The Producers, Broadway, HBO's The Wire) and Hollywood and Broadway Producer Rent, Avenue Q and Director Barbara Epstein The Mickey Mouse Club as Super Nanny in the Worldwide premiere of Twisted T.V a new musical.

From 2009 to 2012, Manning appeared as the Green Girl in Shout! The Mod Musical directed by Broadway Director and actress Kim.R.Jordan (the original television series FAME) for N.C.L Productions, based in Miami.

From 2016 to July 2018, Manning appeared in a series of concerts called Sunday At The Musicals for The Royal Variety club of Great Britain in the West End for Paul Burton Productions.

Manning is also an established drama, spoken voice and LAMDA examinations teacher and children's director.

== Recording career and Petula Clark ==
In early 2007, Manning was chosen by British composer Alexander S. Bermange and Petula Clark to sing Petula Clark's song "My Love Will Never Die" on her album In Her Own Write. Her rendition of "My Love Will Never Die" released worldwide by Sepia Records, and was given a rave review on talkingbroadway.com and also on Clark's own website. The album is also available from Dress Circle and Amazon.

== Theatre ==
Year	Show	Role	Venue	Notes
1998 to 1999	The Rocky Horror Show	Phanton and u/s Janet	Victoria Palace Theatre	
2001' to 2002	Spend Spend Spend	Air Hostess and u/s Young Viv	English Theatre of Frankfurt	
2002 to 2003	The Rocky Horror Show	Janet	European Tour	
2003	Grease	Rizzo	Jersey Opera House	
2004	Thursford Christmas Concert	Soprano	Thursford Collection	
2005	Jason Robert Brown	Ensemble	Players' Theatre	
2006	Nine	Mama Magdelana	Royal Academy of Music	
2007 to 2008	That's Hollywood	Judy Garland	Los Angeles	
2007 to 2008	Sing It And Swing It	Sweet Sue	Los Angeles	
2007 to 2008	Twisted T.V	Super Nanny	Los Angeles	
2009 to 2012	SHOUT! The Mod Musical	The Green Girl	N.C.L Productions, Miami	
2016 to 2019	Sunday At The Musicals	Paul Burton Productions	West End, London	

=== Albums ===
Year	Album
1999	The Rocky Horror Show Live
2007	Petula Clark's In Her Own Write – on the track "My Love Will Never Die"

== All The Arts Drama Festival ==
Manning was also a judge at the 2013 All The Arts Drama and Poetry Competition.
