= The Very Group =

Online retailer

The Very Group Limited
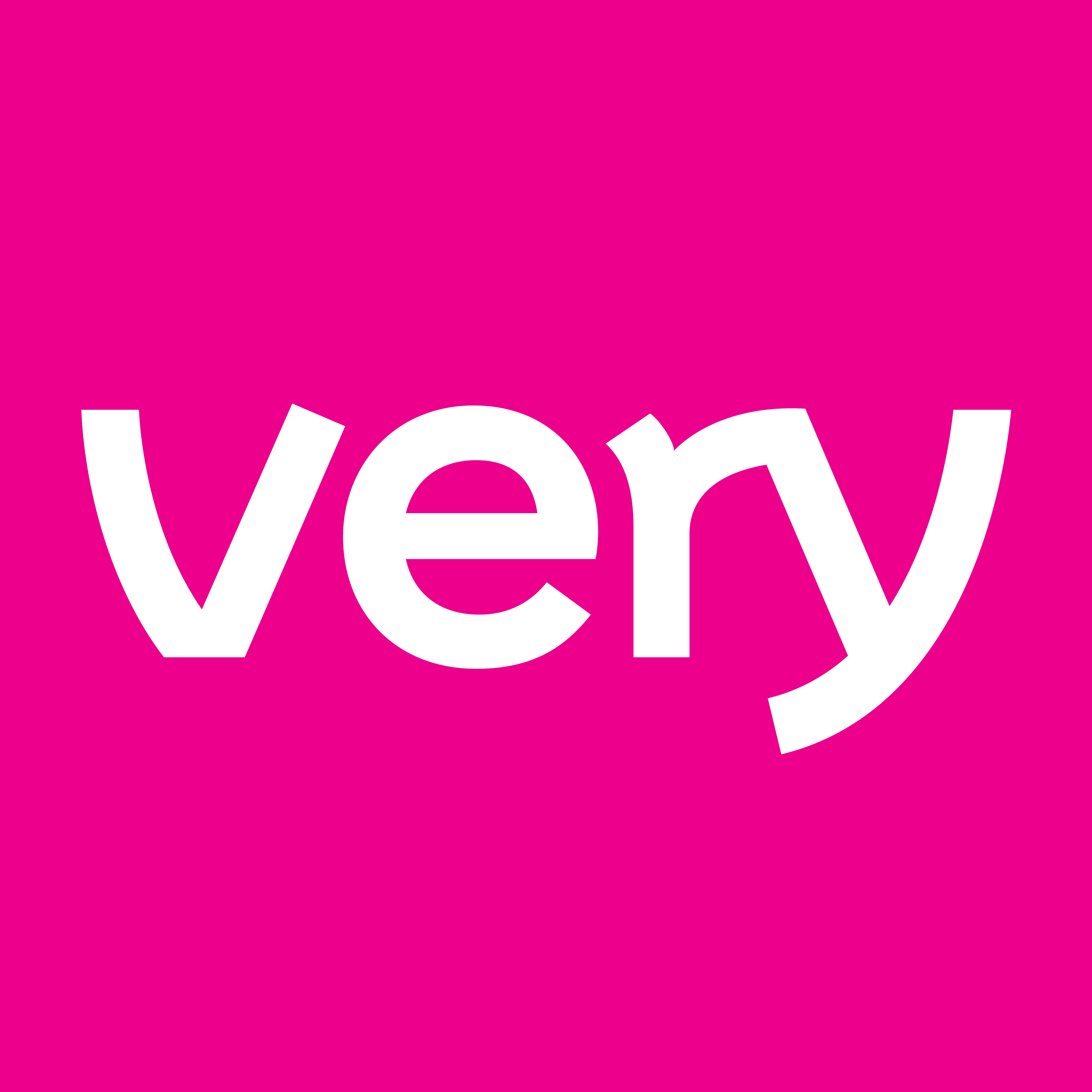
- Formerly: March U.K. Limited (2003–2008); Shop Direct Limited (2008–2020)
- Type: Private
- Industry: Retail; Home shopping; Financial services
- Predecessor: Littlewoods Shop Direct Group
- Founded: 1 November 2005; 21 years ago; (1923 as Littlewoods Pools)
- Founders: David and Frederick Barclay
- Headquarters: Speke, Liverpool, United Kingdom
- Key people: Robbie Feather (CEO)
- Products: Clothing; Electronics; Furniture; Homeware; Jewellery
- Brands: Very; Littlewoods.com
- Owner: The Carlyle Group
- Divisions: Very
- Website: theverygroup.com

The Very Group Limited is a multi-brand online retailer and financial services provider in the United Kingdom and Ireland. Its head offices are based in the Speke area of the city of Liverpool, England. The brand was established in November 2005 as a result of the merger of the former Littlewoods and Shop Direct companies. The retailer was known as Littlewoods Shop Direct Group until a corporate rebranding to Shop Direct Group in May 2008. In 2013, the company rebranded to Shop Direct, dropping the 'group' from its name. Shop Direct rebranded themselves to The Very Group in 2020.

A business group trading via several digital department stores, The Very Group traces its roots to a variety of mail order companies in northern England, the football pools and mail order business founded by John Moores, as well as the Manchester-based home shopping business of Great Universal Stores. These companies were purchased by Sir David and Frederick Barclay in 2003, and a major business restructuring took place leading to a merger of two companies that had "been arch rivals for the best part of 100 years".

Since the merger of what had been struggling businesses in 2005, ongoing restructuring and modernisation of the company has resulted in Shop Direct emerging as one of the largest online retailers in the UK. Its traditional paper-based and phone-in orders system has been superseded by electronic commerce technology.

The group is now amongst the largest online retailers in the UK, with annual sales of £2.13bn for the year to June 2024, and EBITDA up 8.4% to £267m

The group's brands are Very.co.uk, Littlewoods.com, Very Exclusive and Very Ireland (rebranded from 'Littlewoods Ireland' in July 2022). The former Shop Direct brands are Additions Direct, Abound, Choice, Great Universal, Isme, K&Co, Kays, Marshall Ward and Woolworths. In 2009, The Very Group acquired the brand name of the failed Woolworths Group and re-established it as an online-only operation; this closed in 2015 and the Woolworths UK brand was sold in July 2021 to Woolworth in Germany.

On November 10, 2025, three days after the Competition and Consumer Protection Commission approved the transaction, The Carlyle Group completed the purchase of the company.

== History ==
=== Origins ===
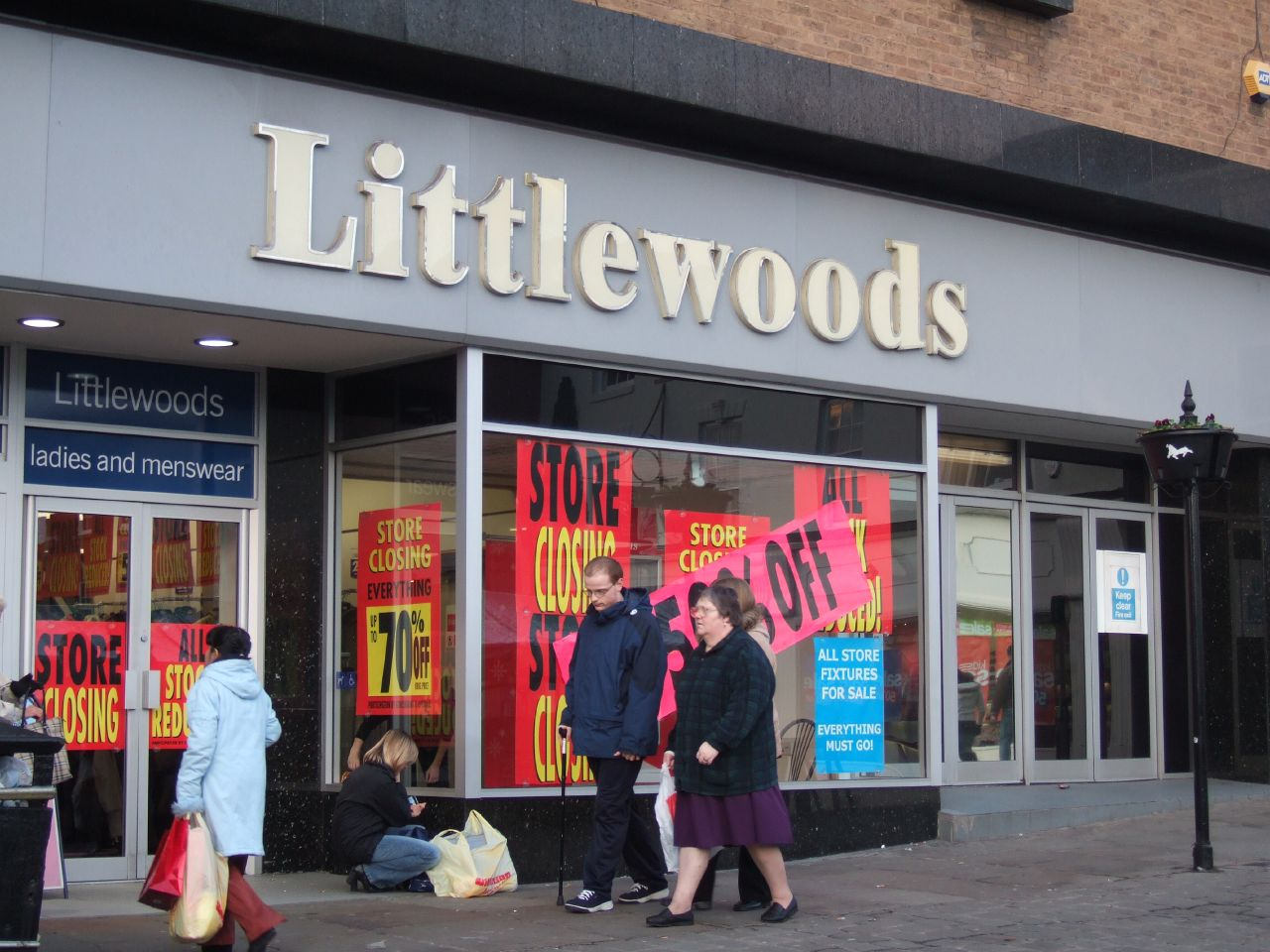
A former Littlewoods branch in Chesterfield, Derbyshire

The Very Group traces its roots to a variety of independent mail order and retail companies in northern England, particularly Littlewoods, the pools and mail order business founded by John Moores, as well as the Manchester-based home shopping business of Great Universal Stores. Other businesses from this time that became part of Shop Direct included K&Co (formerly Kays Catalogues).

Founded by John Moores and his brother Cecil in 1923, Littlewoods was initially a football pools company, which used its network of pools agents and printing company (founded in 1928) to establish itself as a catalogue retailer from 1932 onwards.

In November 2002, the Moores family sold Littlewoods to the Barclay brothers for £750 million.

Littlewoods also owned the Index chain of stores.

The home shopping/catalogues business of Argos and Homebase owner, GUS plc, ARG Equation (which included Choice, Great Universal, Innovations, Kays, and Marshall Ward) was de-merged and bought by the Barclay brothers in 2003, where it became Shop Direct.

=== Merger: Littlewoods Shop Direct Group ===
The logo of Littlewoods Shop Direct Group, used between 2005 and 2008.

It was announced in March 2005 that part of the Index chain of catalogue shops was to be sold to GUS plc (then owner of Argos) and the remainder was to be closed.

In July 2005, Associated British Foods purchased the 120-branch Littlewoods retail chain on behalf of its retail subsidiary Primark for £409 million. Some of the stores were converted into branches of Primark, and the remainder were sold on to other retailers. The Littlewoods name disappeared from the British high street in March 2006.

Following these disposals, and clearance from the Competition Commission, the Littlewoods home shopping business was formally merged with that of Shop Direct (the former GUS plc home shopping business) in October 2005, to form the United Kingdom's largest home shopping business. The merger was in reality effected in early 2004 when work started on a business optimisation programme, consolidating various business functions.

Following the merger, Littlewoods Shop Direct Group moved its headquarters from Manchester city centre to Skyways House in Speke, south Liverpool.

The then newly appointed chief executive Mark Newton-Jones said the merger had "been the biggest challenge of all – taking two companies that [had] been arch rivals for the best part of 100 years and bringing them together. Not just from an operational point of view, but also two different business cultures".

=== Post-merger ===
In May 2008, Littlewoods Shop Direct Group announced it would change its corporate brand name to Shop Direct Group, to reflect the multi-branded nature of the business. In July 2008, Shop Direct completed its purchase of the Empire Stores brand name and customer base from mail order competitor Redcats.

In May 2008, Home Delivery Network, previously Shop Direct Group's logistics division, was separated from the group and subsequently renamed Yodel.

With the demise of the Woolworths Group in January 2009, Shop Direct purchased rights to children's clothing brand Ladybird along with the Woolworths trade name from the administrators. The takeover of the Woolworths brand by Shop Direct was announced on 2 February 2009, and the new online retailer began trading on 25 June that year. In 2015, the Woolworths.co.uk brand was closed, and in July 2021, the Woolworths UK brand was sold to Woolworth in Germany.

At the start of 2009, Shop Direct predicted growth in online sales, with a spokesperson saying: "We anticipate that 70 per cent of our sales will be online by 2010/11 and, therefore, the future of our business is online-led." It was confirmed in late 2009 that it was on track to achieve 70% of its sales via the internet by 2011. By the end of the 2012/13 financial year, this figure had reached 78%.

In 2013, the company rebranded to Shop Direct, dropping the 'group' from its name.

On 27 October 2017 Shop Direct successfully placed its debut bond.

In 2019, Shop Direct rebranded to The Very Group.

In February 2024, The Very Group took a loan of £125 million from The Carlyle Group and UAE-based International Media Investments in return for a degree of control of The Very Group. The group's finances had been hurt by increasing interest rates, and the directors stated the loan should provide working capital until at least June 2025. In March 2024, The Very Group auditors, Deloitte, announced they had resigned after stating they struggled to access "appropriate and relevant information in respect of certain financing arrangements between companies in the wider group". Very Group's ownership is spread across many different companies, some unaudited, with an ultimate offshore owner.

== Intellectual properties ==
=== Very (Shop Direct Home Shopping Limited) ===
- Littlewoods.com
- Very.co.uk
- Very Ireland (https://www.very.ie)

Defunct

- BargainCrazy
- ShopDirect.com
- Littlewoodsireland.ie

=== Brands ===
- V by Very
- Everyday
- Ladybird

Defunct

- Additions Direct
- Abound
- Choice
- Great Universal
- Innovations
- Isme
- K&Co
- Kays
- Marshall Ward

=== Financial services ===
- Very Financial Services

Defunct

- Everyday Financial Solutions
- Shop Direct Financial Services

== Operations ==
Very.co.uk, Littlewoods.com and Littlewoods Ireland retail clothing and footwear, electricals, home and furniture, gifts and beauty, outdoor and seasonal, and toys. Very Exclusive sells luxury fashion.

As well as its celebrity brands, Shop Direct previously had a stable of own-brand fashion labels. Today, it operates a 'hero' own brand fashion label, V by Very, alongside Ladybird for children. Alongside the core retail business, Shop Direct owns and operates a financial services business, formerly known as Everyday Financial Solutions, and now known as Shop Direct Financial Services.

In July 2022, the company announced the appointment of Lionel Desclée as its new group chief executive, replacing Henry Birch who held the position for over four years.

== Locations ==
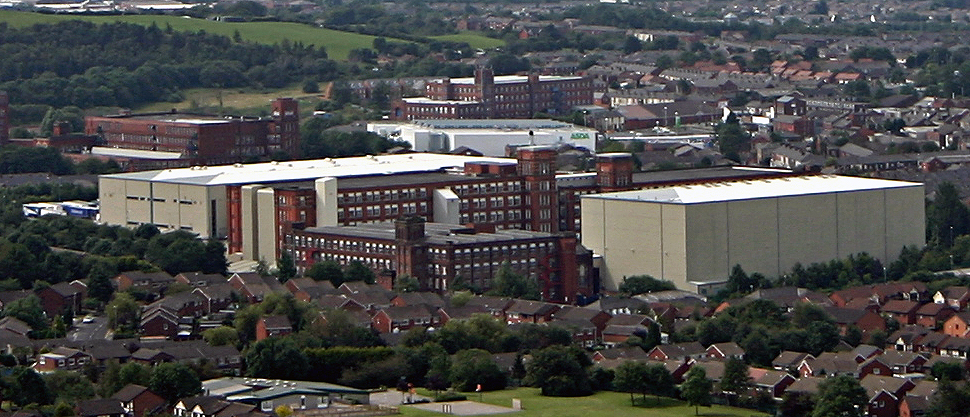
Shaw National Distribution Centre is Shop Direct Group's main warehousing and returns centre; the base of logistics.

The Very Group's headquarters is Skyways House, a £31 million renovated aircraft hangar, situated in Speke, south Liverpool.

Order processing for The Very Group is primarily undertaken at the 'Skygate' facility based in Kegworth, Derby with a smaller number of large items distributed from Bryn Lane, Wrexham. The old distribution centre at Shaw, Oldham comprised six former cotton mills Lily 1, Lily 2, Newby, Rutland, Ash and Dee. Subsequently, Rutland, Ash and Dee mills have been demolished and replaced with new purpose made buildings. It is one of Europe's largest retail distribution centres. The Very Group processes returns at Raven Mill in Chadderton.

On 9 May 2006, the company announced the closure of three warehouses in Eccles, Wigan and Worcester. These closures have taken place, with all operations being transferred to their Shaw and Crompton site. Around 1,200 jobs were lost from the closures, but further jobs were created at the Shaw National Distribution Centre.

In 2016, The Very Group launched a 12,400-square-foot (1,150 m^{2}) training, conferencing and wellbeing facility for its Liverpool HQ staff, calling the building "The Cube".

== Relocation of distribution business ==
In Spring 2018, The Very Group announced that 2,000 jobs were at risk from redundancy as the company intends to close three distribution centres and move their distribution business to the East Midlands by 2020.
