= 2000 Laurence Olivier Awards =

Edition of London theatre awards

The 2000 Laurence Olivier Awards were held in 2000 in London celebrating excellence in West End theatre by the Society of London Theatre.

== Winners and nominees ==
Details of winners (in bold) and nominees, in each award category, per the Society of London Theatre.

Play of the Year	Best New Musical
**Goodnight Children Everywhere by Richard Nelson – RSC at the Barbican Pit**; Perfect Days by Liz Lochhead – Vaudeville; Rose by Martin Sherman – National Theatre Cottesloe; The Lady in the Van by Alan Bennett – Queen's; Three Days of Rain by Richard Greenberg – Donmar Warehouse	**Honk – National Theatre Olivier**; Mamma Mia – Prince Edward; Spend, Spend, Spend – Piccadilly; The Lion King – Lyceum
Best New Comedy	Best Entertainment
**The Memory of Water by Shelagh Stephenson – Vaudeville**; Comic Potential by Alan Ayckbourn – Lyric; Quartet by Ronald Harwood – Albery	**Defending the Caveman – Apollo**; Al Murray: The Pub Landlord – New Ambassadors; Barefaced Chic – Theatre Royal Haymarket; Soul Train – Victoria Palace
Outstanding Musical Production
**Candide – National Theatre Olivier**; A Funny Thing Happened on the Way to the Forum – Regent's Park Open Air; Dick Whittington – Sadler's Wells; The Pajama Game – Victoria Palace
Best Actor	Best Actress
**Henry Goodman as Shylock in The Merchant of Venice – National Theatre Olivier / Cottesloe**; Roger Allam as Bassov in Summerfolk – National Theatre Olivier; Stephen Dillane as Henry in The Real Thing – Donmar Warehouse / Albery; Michael Sheen as Jimmy Porter in Look Back in Anger – National Theatre Lyttelton; Antony Sher as King Leontes in The Winter's Tale – RSC at the Barbican	**Janie Dee as Jacie Triplethree in Comic Potential – Lyric**; Jennifer Ehle as Annie in The Real Thing – Donmar Warehouse / Albery; Maggie Smith as Miss Mary Shepherd/Margaret Fairchild in The Lady in the Van – Queen's; Alison Steadman as Teresa in The Memory of Water – Vaudeville
Best Actor in a Musical	Best Actress in a Musical
**Simon Russell Beale as Dr. Pangloss/Voltaire in Candide – National Theatre Olivier**; Rob Edwards as Scar in The Lion King – Lyceum; Daniel Evans as Candide in Candide – National Theatre Olivier; Ben Keaton as Captain Jeffrey T. Spaulding in Animal Crackers – Lyric; Gus MacGregor as Buddy Holly in Buddy – Strand	**Barbara Dickson as Viv Nicholson in Spend, Spend, Spend – Piccadilly**; Josette Bushell-Mingo as Rafiki in The Lion King – Lyceum; Rachel Leskovac as Young Viv Nicholson in Spend, Spend, Spend – Piccadilly; Siobhan McCarthy as Donna Sheridan in Mamma Mia – Prince Edward
Best Actor in a Supporting Role	Best Actress in a Supporting Role
**Roger Allam as Henry Graves in Money – National Theatre Olivier**; Michael Bryant as Semyon Dvoetochie in Summerfolk – National Theatre Olivier; Ron Cook as Joxer Daly in Juno and the Paycock – Donmar Warehouse; Michael Williams as Arkadiy Schastlivtsev in The Forest – National Theatre Lyttelton	**Patricia Hodge as Lady Franklin in Money – National Theatre Olivier**; Anne-Marie Duff as Lisa Morrison in Collected Stories – Theatre Royal Haymarket; Estelle Kohler as Paulina in The Winter's Tale – RSC at the Barbican; Kika Markham as Hilde Latymer in A Song at Twilight – Gielgud
Best Supporting Performance in a Musical
**Jenny Galloway as Rosie Mulligan in Mamma Mia – Prince Edward**; Joseph Alessi as Emanuel Ravelli in Animal Crackers – Lyric; Steven Houghton as Keith Nicholson in Spend, Spend, Spend – Piccadilly; Louise Plowright as Tanya Chesham-Leigh in Mamma Mia – Prince Edward; Denis Quilley as Baron Von Thunder and Martin in Candide – National Theatre Olivier
Best Director	Best Theatre Choreographer
**Trevor Nunn for Summerfolk, The Merchant of Venice and Troilus and Cressida – National Theatre Olivier / Cottesloe**; David Leveaux for The Real Thing – Donmar Warehouse / Albery; Jeremy Sams for Spend, Spend, Spend – Piccadilly; Julie Taymor for The Lion King – Lyceum	**Garth Fagan for The Lion King – Lyceum**; Peter Darling for Candide – National Theatre Olivier; Craig Revel Horwood for Spend, Spend, Spend – Piccadilly; Stephen Mear for Soul Train – Victoria Palace
Best Set Designer	Best Costume Designer
**Rob Howell for Richard III – RSC at the Savoy, Troilus and Cressida – National Theatre Olivier and Vassa – Albery**; Maria Björnson for Plenty – Albery; Lez Brotherston for Spend, Spend, Spend – Piccadilly; Richard Hudson for The Lion King – Lyceum	**Julie Taymor for The Lion King – Lyceum**; Rob Howell for Money and Troilus and Cressida – National Theatre Olivier; Robert Jones for The Winter's Tale – RSC at the Barbican; Elise Napier and John Napier for Candide – National Theatre Olivier
Best Lighting Designer
**Mark Henderson for Plenty, Vassa – Albery, Spend, Spend, Spend – Piccadilly, Suddenly, Last Summer – Comedy, The Forest – National Theatre Lyttelton, The Lion, the Witch and the Wardrobe – RSC at the Barbican and The Real Thing – Donmar Warehouse / Albery**; Howard Harrison for Private Lives – National Theatre Lyttelton, Sleep with Me – National Theatre Cottesloe and The Tempest – RSC at the Barbican; Donald Holder for The Lion King – Lyceum; Peter Mumford for Collected Stories – Theatre Royal Haymarket, Richard III – RSC at the Savoy, Summerfolk – National Theatre Olivierand The Merchant of Venice – National Theatre Olivier / Cottesloe
Outstanding Achievement in Dance	Best New Dance Production
**Jiří Kylián for the season, Nederlands Dans Theater 1 – Sadler's Wells**; Nina Ananiashvili in Don Quixote, Bolshoi Ballet – London Coliseum; Pina Bausch for conceiving Viktor – Sadler's Wells; David Bintley for choreographing Edward II, Birmingham Royal Ballet – Sadler's Wells	**Symphony of Psalms, Nederlands Dans Theater 1 – Sadler's Wells**; Sandpiper Ballet, San Francisco Ballet – Sadler's Wells; The Cage, San Francisco Ballet – Sadler's Wells; Viktor, Tanztheater Wuppertal – Sadler's Wells
Outstanding Achievement in Opera	Outstanding New Opera Production
**English National Opera for their high standard of work – London Coliseum**; Kim Begley in Parsifal, English National Opera – London Coliseum; Rosemary Joshua in Semele, English National Opera – London Coliseum; Bryn Terfel in Falstaff, The Royal Opera – Royal Opera House	**Hansel and Gretel, Welsh National Opera – Sadler's Wells**; Alcina, English National Opera – London Coliseum; Parsifal, English National Opera – London Coliseum; Semele, English National Opera – London Coliseum
Outstanding Achievement
**Peter O'Toole in Jeffrey Bernard Is Unwell**

== Productions with multiple nominations and awards ==
The following 23 productions, including two operas, received multiple nominations:

- 8: Spend, Spend, Spend and The Lion King
- 6: Candide
- 4: Mamma Mia, Summerfolk and The Real Thing
- 3: Money, The Merchant of Venice, The Winter's Tale and Troilus and Cressida
- 2: Animal Crackers, Collected Stories, Comic Potential, Parsifal, Plenty, Richard III, Semele, Soul Train, The Forest, The Lady in the Van, The Memory of Water, Vassa and Viktor

The following seven productions received multiple awards:

- 2: Candide, Money, Spend, Spend, Spend, The Lion King, The Merchant of Venice, Troilus and Cressida and Vassa

== See also ==
- 54th Tony Awards
