= Safa Abdulla Al Geabury =

Swiss businessman (born 1963)

- Born: 5 June 1963 (age 62)
- Occupation: Businessman
- Known for: Gambling

Safa Abdulla Al Geabury (born 5 June 1963) is a Swiss businessman. He is the owner of Safaforex S.A. (formerly Billionaire S.A.A.A.A.A) and made his money in foreign currency dealing and trading in precious stones and jewellery.

== Career ==
Al Geabury made his money in foreign currency dealing and trading in precious stones and jewellery. Safaforex S.A. (formerly Billionaire S.A.) is a firm that imports and exports precious stones and jewellery.

In 2006, the Swiss authorities sought the extradition from the United States of Yu Mei Wu, a Taiwanese national, who was alleged to have fraudulently obtained jewellery worth more than US$32 million from Al Geabury. He was a director of Kingdom of Treasures Limited which was dissolved in 2011.

== London ==
Al Geabury formerly divided his time between Geneva and London, with a home in London's exclusive Grosvenor Square and later Sloane Street. In 2015, Al Geabury was sued by The Ritz Club, located in the basement of The Ritz Hotel owned by the Barclay Brothers, for £2 million after a cheque he had written to settle gambling debts incurred in 2014 in one night's play at roulette, was not honoured. Al Geabury has claimed that he suffers from a gambling addiction and the club should have known that and not extended him credit. In July 2015, a judge ruled that Al Geabury should honour his debts, commenting that he was "the author of his own misfortunes".

In November 2015, a worldwide freezing order was imposed by a British court for £2.6 million but no money has been paid. In court proceedings in London in April 2016, for which Al Geabury was not present, he was sentenced to 10 months in jail for contempt of court for failure to settle his gambling debts which with interest and court charges have risen to £3.2 million.

== Wealth ==
In a British court in June 2015, Al Geabury accepted that his wealth, including his collection of Islamic art, was in excess of $1 billion, however, in court proceedings in London in April 2016, at which Al Geabury was not present, it was claimed on his behalf that the art collection was only promised by an uncle and that he does not have it. It was also said that he had no assets worth more than £20,000.
