= Sportech =

British online gambling and entertainment company

Sportech PLC
- Type: Public (LSE: SPO)
- Industry: Online gambling
- Headquarters: United Kingdom
- Area served: Worldwide
- Key people: Richard McGuire, Chief Executive Officer
- Website: sportechplc.com

Sportech PLC is an online gambling and entertainment company headquartered in the United Kingdom. The company is traded on the London Stock Exchange under the symbol SPO.L; the stock is a component of the Alternative Investment Market. The company, formerly known as Rodime PLC, was originally an electronics company specialising in hard disk drives based in Scotland. In 2000, the company changed its name to Sportech PLC, after acquiring Littlewoods Pools from The Littlewoods Organisation for £160 million.

== History ==
Sportech began as a small electronics company, Rodime PLC, based in Scotland in 1979. By 1986, it was listed on the London Stock Exchange. The company specialized in manufacturing hard disks, inventing the 3.5-inch hard drive in early 1985, but soon became unprofitable due to delays in getting the product to market. By 1991, Rodime ceased manufacturing hard disks. By early 2000, Rodime was a shell company with a $34 million overdraft and four employees, primarily in the business of suing other hard drive vendors for patent infringements related to Rodime's 3.5-inch drive development work. The company negotiated patent-licensing settlements with Seagate Technology, Conner Peripherals, and IBM.

In 2000, businessman Trevor Hemmings masterminded a deal that merged Rodime with the much larger Littlewoods Pools business. Littlewoods had been hurt by the advent of the lottery. After the acquisition, the company changed its name to Sportech PLC.

Sportech purchased Scientific Games Racing, a division of Scientific Games Corporation, on 5 October 2010. Scientific Games Racing is one of three large bet-processing companies in the United States horse-racing industry, whose clients include major racetracks in California and New Jersey, as well as off-track betting companies in parts of New York state.

== Football pools ==
Littlewoods' football pools were founded in 1923 by John Moores. The Vernons pools were established in 1925, and Zetters in 1933.

The National Lottery, which was introduced in 1994, offered higher jackpots. This led to the decrease in market for football pools. The number of football-pool players declined from a peak of 10 million in 1994 to 830,000 in 2006. Subsequently, Vernons closed its doorstep collectors operation in February 1998, but ran a partnered lottery-base game with National Lottery during the 1998/99 football season. This helped it resume its business operations thereafter.

In 2000, Littlewoods Pools was acquired by Rodime as part of a £161 million deal Littlewoods Gaming. Rechristened Sportech, the company's Littlewoods brand bought Zetters, a football pool firm with 60,000 customers, in 2002 for £1.35 million. It bought Vernons from Ladbrokes in 2007. The Littlewoods, Vernons, and Zetters pools were merged into one new brand, "The New Football Pools", in August 2008.

In March 2017, Sportech announced that it has entered a ‘conditional agreement’ to sell its Football Pools division for £83 million to ‘FP Acquisitions Limited’ a newly created company controlled by the funds of London private equity firm OpCapita.

== Poker ==
In 2001, Sportech was one of three firms worldwide to win gambling licences from the Isle of Man to run online casinos in there. Leveraging the Littlewoods brand name, it launched littlewoodscasino.com.

Towards the end of 2003, Sportech decided to relocate its gaming operations from the Isle of Man to the Netherlands Antilles in order to broaden the range of games it currently offers. The terms of the Isle of Man were restrictive, with operators unable to advertise their services in jurisdictions that do not yet have legalised online gaming. The Isle of Man would force the company to undergo a recertification process in order to upgrade its software, and customers were limited as to how they could withdraw money from their accounts. Seeing a successful launch of the Littlewoods Casino product, the company wanted to move on and include Littlewoods Poker and an integrated jackpot product in their offering. Littlewoods Poker was launched in 2003.

== Company today ==
In 2008, Sportech signed a strategic partnership with 888sport, replacing Cryptologic as the firm's software supplier.

In their 2016 full year results Sportech announced profits before tax climbed to £13.8m, compared to £11.8m in 2015. In 2016 the company won a long-running battle with HMRC over a £97m VAT repayment on one of its games. In March 2017 Sportech announced it would return £20 million to shareholders by way of a Tender Offer to buy back shares.
