= Oscar Humphries =

Australian curator, art dealer and journalist

- Born: 23 April 1981 (age 45); Sydney, Australia
- Education: The Hall School, Hampstead
- Occupations: Art dealer, journalist
- Family: Barry Humphries (father)

Oscar Humphries (born 23 April 1981) is an Australian curator, art dealer and journalist.

== Biography ==
He was editor of Press Holdings's art magazine Apollo from 2010 until 2013.

Since 2000, he has written on a variety of subjects including art and design for British newspapers and magazines, including The Sunday Times and Tatler. In 2007 Humphries was made a contributing editor of The Spectator and was the launch editor of The Spectator Australia in 2008.

As director of Sebastian + Barquet London he curated shows on Carlo Mollino, Paolo Venini and Rick Owens. As head of international sales for Timothy Taylor Gallery he curated "The Tightrope Walker" with Emma Dexter. In 2016, he curated the exhibition "Albers & the Bauhaus", examining the artist's pre-war output in the context of the work of his peers.

In 2018 Humphries curated "Sean Scully – San Cristóbal" at Cuadra San Cristóbal, the modernist estate designed by Luis Barragán in Mexico City. The site-specific exhibition was the first art show held at the property and brought together Scully's paintings and sculptures with Barragán's architecture.

Humphries later produced "Mental Escapology", Damien Hirst's first public exhibition in Switzerland, which presented more than forty works across indoor and outdoor sites in St. Moritz, including large-scale sculptures installed on the frozen surface of Lake St. Moritz.

== Personal life ==
Oscar Humphries was born in Sydney, the son of Barry Humphries and his third wife, surrealist painter Diane Millstead. He was educated at Bryanston School and Stowe School.
