= Kays Catalogues =

Former mail-order catalogue company

Kays of Worcester
- Industry: Mail order
- Founded: 1889
- Defunct: 2004
- Fate: Merged with Littlewoods to become Shop Direct
- Successor: Shop Direct Group
- Headquarters: Worcester (also major presence in Leeds)
- Key people: William Kilbourne Kay
- Parent: Great Universal Stores plc

Kay & Co Ltd was a mail-order catalogue business, with offices and warehouses throughout the United Kingdom.

The company had offices and warehouses in Worcester, Leeds, Glasgow, Newtown, Bradford, Bristol, Droitwich, Lancaster, and York.

The company often commissioned artwork for the front of its catalogues. For instance, in 1974 and 1979, two pictures of Worcester Cathedral were used. In fact, the cathedral at Worcester was used as the basis for the front cover from 1958 until 1982.

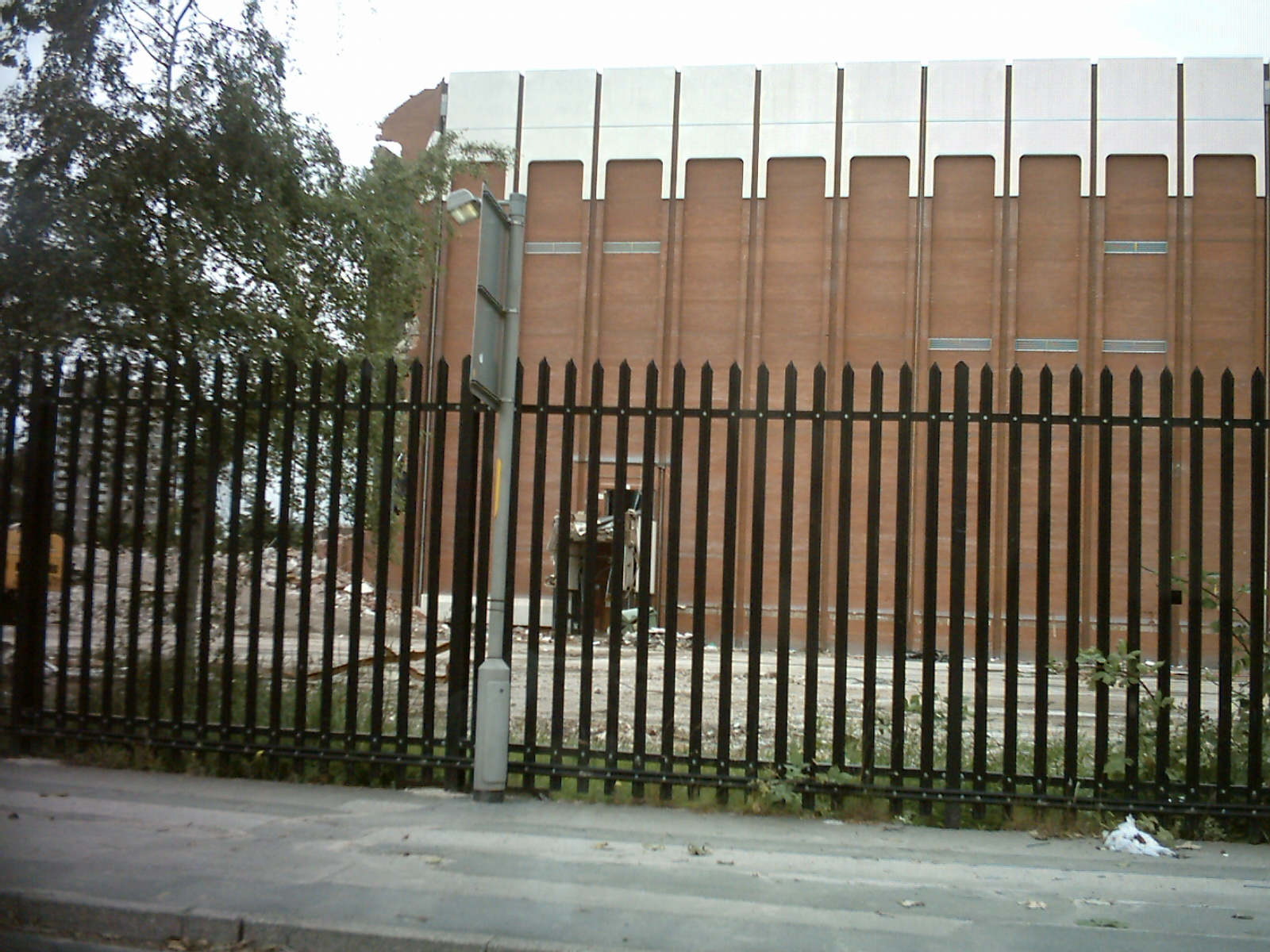
Kays Catalogues Distribution Centre on Marshall Street in Holbeck, Leeds, undergoing demolition.

The company was founded in Worcester in 1889 by William Kilbourne Kay as Kay's of Worcester at St Swithen's Street. In 1937, the business was purchased by Great Universal Stores.

The company opened a purpose-built warehouse in Leeds in 1981, which subsequently closed in August 2004 (pictured). On 23 February 2007, Kays original depot in Worcester closed.

The closures were part of the work to amalgamate Kays and Littlewoods under the new brand name Shop Direct. Shop Direct is centred on the traditional home of the Littlewoods group, Liverpool. The Kays brand continued to be used by Shop Direct until January 2011, when Kays, Empire Stores and Great Universal Stores merged to become K&Co. Ultimately, Kays became part of Littlewoods at the end of July 2015.
