= David Ekserdjian =

Emeritus Professor of art and film history at the University of Leicester

David Patrick Martin Ekserdjian (born 28 October 1955) is Emeritus Professor of Art and Film History at the University of Leicester.

== Early life and family ==
Ekserdjian was educated at Westminster School and the University of Cambridge. He is the son of London School of Economics (BComm) graduate Colonel Nubar Martin "Bill" Ekserdjian (1913–1967), a Northhampshireman whose family were Armenian nobility – Amira – a class of influential wealthy Armenians in the Ottoman Empire between the 18th and 19th centuries. Col. Ekserdjian was an executive director of Iraq Petroleum Company founded by Calouste Gulbenkian, an avid art collector; both Gulbenkian and his son, Nubar, shared an interest in art with Col. Ekserdjian. David's brother is barrister Angus George Martin Ekserdjian (1948–1989), an alumnus of Westminster School.

Other members of the Ekserdjian family who have been art historians include Hmayeag Ekserdjian who wrote Memoir on the Two Hundred Fiftieth Anniversary of the Holy Cross Church of Uskudar 1676-1926, as well as his son Alexander, an art historian at Yale University.

== Career ==
Ekserdjian spent the years 1991 to 1997 working for Christie's. He was Editor of art magazine Apollo (1997–2004). His academic posts include lecturer at the Courtauld Institute of Art from 1986 until 1987. In 2017–18, he was the Slade Professor of Fine Art at the University of Oxford. He has been a member of the Courtauld Institute Board since 1998. His publications include introduction and notes for Vasari's Lives of the Artists (1996) and Correggio (1997).

== Selected publications ==
- Correggio. 1997.
- Parmigianino. 2006.
- Treasures from Budapest. European Masterpieces from Leonardo to Schiele. 2010. (editor)
- Bronze. Royal Academy of Arts, London, 2012. (With Cecilia Treves]) ISBN 978-1907533280
- Correggio and Parmigianino: Art in Parma During the Sixteenth Century. 2016.
