= Apollo (magazine) =

Monthly arts magazine founded in England

- Cover of Apollo magazine, March 2026, featuring The Balbi Children painting by Anthony van Dyck
- Editor: Edward Behrens
- Former editors: Thomas Marks
- Categories: Fine arts
- Frequency: Monthly (double issue for July/August)
- Founded: 1925
- Company: OQS Media
- Country: England
- Based in: London
- Language: English
- Website: apollo-magazine.com
- ISSN: 0003-6536
- OCLC: 1121415135

Apollo is an English-language monthly magazine covering the visual arts of all periods from antiquity to the present day.

== History and profile ==
Apollo was founded in 1925, in London. The contemporary Apollo features a mixture of reviews, art-world news and scholarly articles. It has been described as "The International Magazine for Collectors". Apollo was owned by the Barclay brothers through the Press Holdings Media Group company until it was sold to OQS Media in September 2024.

The magazine rewards excellence in arts through annual Apollo Magazine Awards, including naming Sir Mark Jones, former director of the Victoria and Albert Museum, "Personality of the Year" in 2011.

In the United States the magazine advertising and subscriptions was managed entirely by Valerie Allan from 1968 to 2008 first from New York then, starting in 1972, from Los Angeles.

== Content ==
In line with its reputation as a magazine for collectors, Apollo regularly reports on museum acquisitions and international art fairs, including The European Fine Art Fair (TEFAF) in Maastricht, Netherlands, and Frieze Art Fair in London's Regent's Park, as well as publishing profiles on eminent collectors, such as Eli Broad, the Duke of Devonshire, Anita Zabludowich, Robert H. Smith, Sheihka Hussah al-Sabah and Charles Ryskamp.

Along with regular news and reviews, the magazine has published interviews with contemporary artists including Howard Hodgkin, Marc Quinn, Antony Gormley and architect Norman Foster.

Recent collaborative editions have included special issues in partnership with the J. Paul Getty Museum and the Yale Center for British Art. The current editor is Edward Behrens and regular contributors include Martin Gayford, Alan Powers, Emma Crichton-Miller, Simon Grant, Vincent Katz and art-market correspondent Susan Moore.

== Regular features ==
- Agenda, also known as Art Diary: A guide to what's on worldwide
- News: Developments in the world of art and architecture
- Exhibitions: In-depth reviews of international exhibitions
- Books: Recommendations and reviews of recent and forthcoming publications

== Editors ==
- R. Sidney Glover: 1925–29
- Thomas Leman Hare: 1929–35
- Herbert Furst: 1935–43
- William Jennings: 1943–45
- Horace Shipp: 1945–56
- Wynne Jeudwine: 1956–59
- William Jennings: 1959–60
- Denys Sutton: 1962–87
- Anna Somers Cocks: 1987–90
- Robin Simon: 1990–97
- David Ekserdjian: 1997–2004
- Michael Hall: 2004–10
- Oscar Humphries: 2010–13
- Thomas Marks: 2013–2021
- Edward Behrens: 2021–present

== Previous owners ==
- Lord Duveen and Tancred Borenius: 1925–29
- The Apollo Press (publishers): 1929–33
- The Field Group: 1933–39
- William Jennings: 1939–60
- H. W. Finnegan Jennings: 1960–62
- Financial Times Business Information: 1962–84
- Algy Cluff and Naim Attallah (Namara Group): 1984–90
- Investment company co-owned by the Flick family: 1990–92
- Paul Josefowitz: 1992–2002
- The Telegraph Group (owned by Conrad Black): 2002–03
- Press Holdings Media Group Ltd (owned by the OQS Media): 2024–
