= Rodime =

Scottish company

Rodime PLC
- Industry: Electronics
- Founded: 1979; 47 years ago
- Defunct: 2000
- Fate: Reverse takeover of Littlewoods
- Successor: Sportech PLC
- Headquarters: Glenrothes, Scotland, United Kingdom

Rodime was an electronics company specialising in hard disks, based in Glenrothes, Scotland. It was founded in 1979 by several Scottish and American former employees of Burroughs Corporation and listed on the London Stock Exchange in 1986, becoming Rodime PLC.

Rodime produced a wide range of hard disks, initially 5¼-inch form-factor ST506-compatible devices, but later launching the world's first 3½-inch hard disk, as well as producing SCSI and ATA drives. Of particular note, Rodime produced the hard disks used in Apple Computer's first external hard drive for the Macintosh, the Macintosh Hard Disk 20, which connected to the external floppy disk drive port found on Macintosh computers from that period.

Due to increasing competition and delays in developing new products, Rodime became unprofitable after 1985, and a financial restructuring package was put in place in 1989. However, in 1991, Rodime ceased manufacturing and was reduced to a holding company which continued to pursue patent litigation against other hard disk manufacturers such as Quantum and Seagate.

Some ex-Rodime engineering staff went on to form Calluna Technology, which specialised in 1.8 inch PC Card form-factor hard disks.

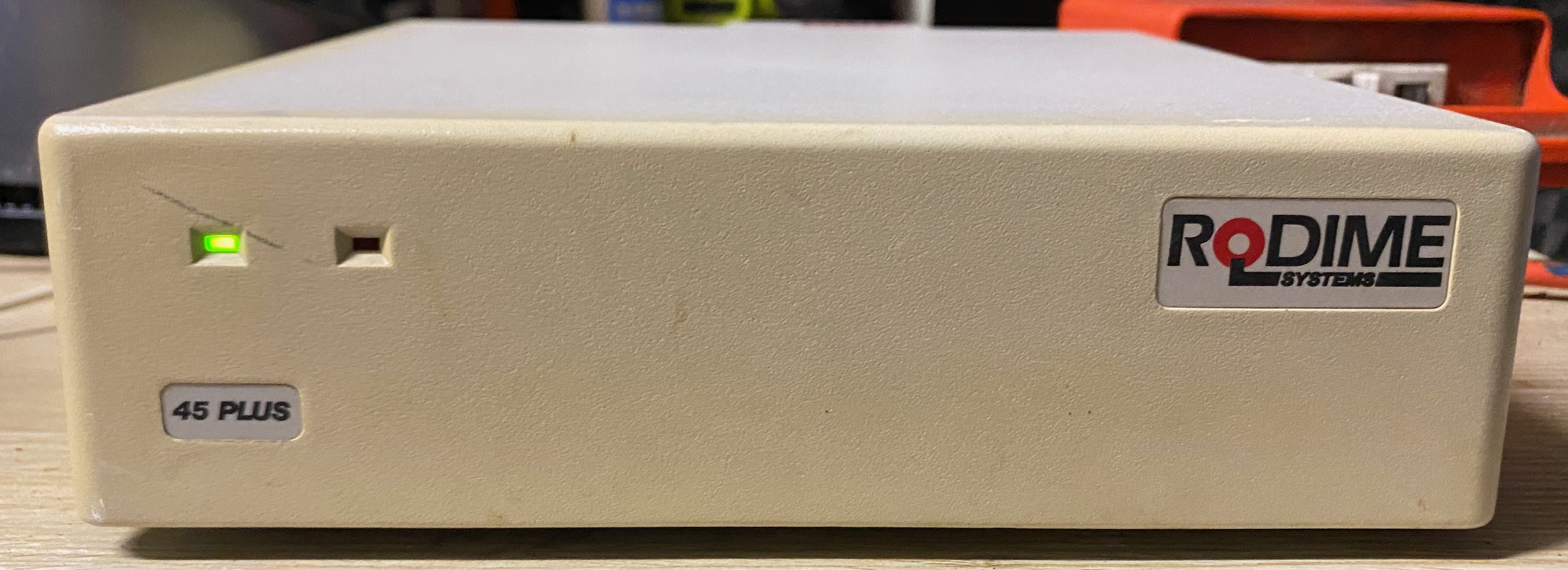
A 45 MB external hard drive from the mid-1980s

In 2000, Rodime PLC performed a reverse takeover of the Littlewoods gaming business, thus changing its principal business to gaming and betting. Soon after, it changed its name to Sportech PLC.
