= Littlewoods =

Defunct retail and betting company

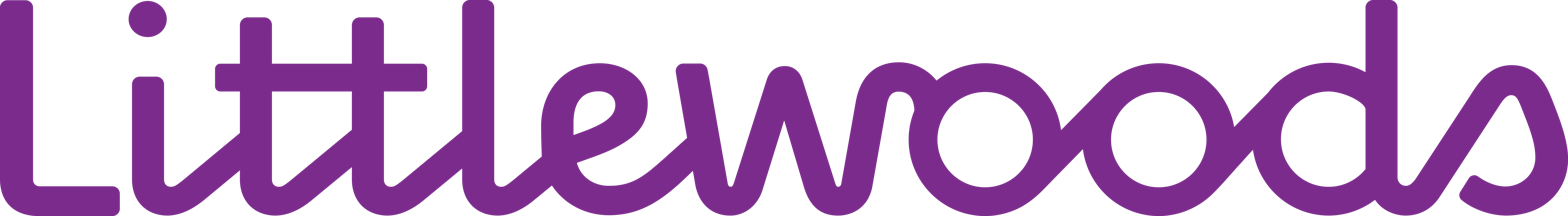
- Industry: Mail order, Football pools
- Founded: 1923 (stores), 1990s (online)
- Founder: Sir John Moores
- Defunct: 2005 (stores)
- Fate: Merged with Kays Catalogues
- Successors: The Very Group; Littlewoods.com; Very.co.uk
- Headquarters: Liverpool, England
- Key people: Sir John Moores (Founder); David and Frederick Barclay (Final owners)
- Owner: The Very Group
- Subsidiaries: Littlewoods Index
- Website: littlewoods.com

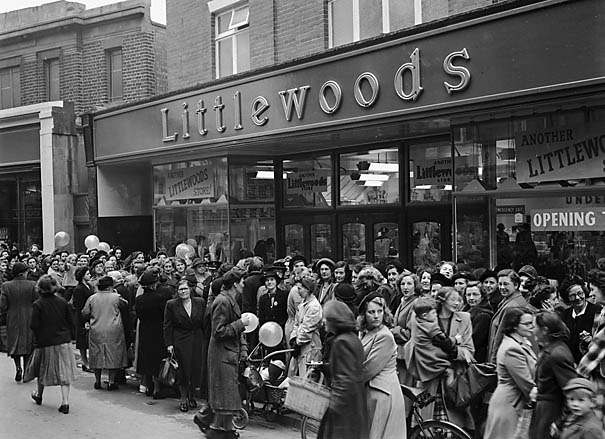
Crowds gather for the opening of a new Littlewoods Store at Oswestry, 1950

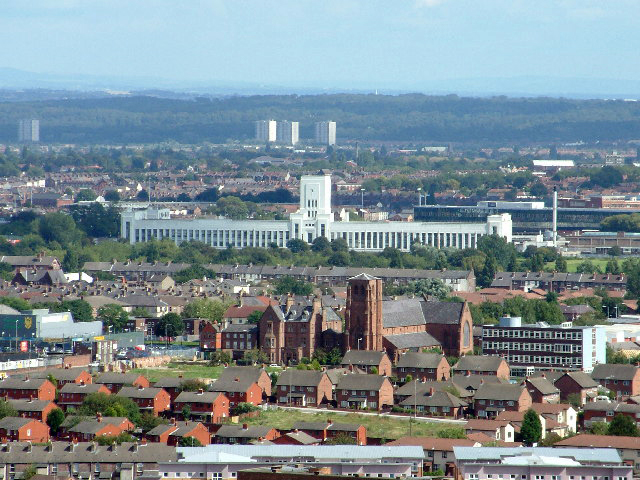
The Littlewoods Building in Liverpool, former headquarters of Littlewoods

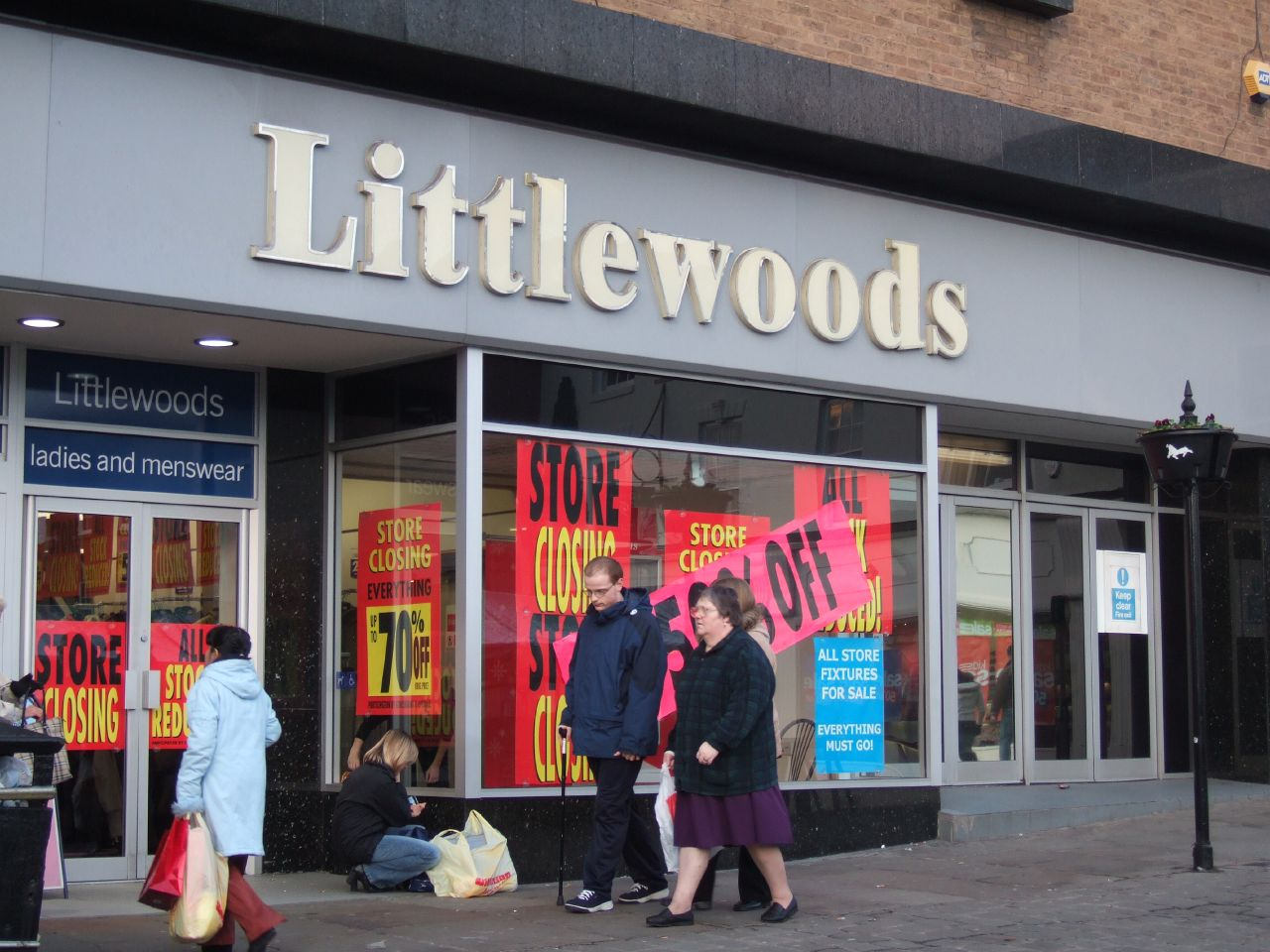
A former Littlewoods branch in Chesterfield, Derbyshire

Littlewoods was a retail and football betting company founded in Liverpool, England, by John Moores in 1923. By the 1980s, it had grown to become the largest private company in Europe but subsequently declined in the face of increased competition from rivals and the Internet. The original company, employing 4,000 people, was wound up in 2005; however, its brand name is retained by The Very Group as the online retailer Littlewoods.com.

== History ==
The original company began in 1923 as a football pools (sports betting) company, known as Littlewoods Pools. After making a loss in the first season of operation, John Moores' original partners withdrew from the venture. Moores persisted with family assistance and by 1932 was in a position to expand the business into mail-order retailing. The first mail-order catalogue was sent to existing subscribers to the pools and the take-up, mostly women, formed 'clubs'. In effect, they became retail agents, collecting money for goods ordered from the catalogue from friends and family and distributing goods shipped to them. The mail-order business expanded and the first Littlewoods high-street store opened in 1937 in Blackpool.

Littlewoods grew as a retail and betting organisation and, at its height, there were about 25,000 employees. In 1982, it was the largest private company in Europe. At one time, it was also the largest family-owned firm in the UK.

Littlewoods ran a division and e-commerce website dedicated to the Irish market, but in July 2022, 'Littlewoods Ireland' became 'Very Ireland', adopting the parent organisation's flagship brand name.

=== Retail arm ===
Littlewoods was among the key retailers to relocate from town-centre stores to new developments, mostly in enterprise zones, to take advantage of the financial incentives they offered. The Merry Hill store, which opened on 14 November 1989, was a notable example. The catalogue market was transformed with the emergence of the Internet and phone transactions slowly diminished after the mid-1990s. It was around this time that Littlewoods began closing its stores, with the outlet at Merry Hill in the West Midlands being one of the first outlets to close in 1996.

In October 2002, the Moores family sold the shopping and catalogue business to David and Frederick Barclay for £750 million.

In 2004, Littlewoods was merged with Kays Catalogues to create the Littlewoods Shop Direct Group (now The Very Group). The amalgamation of the two businesses led to the closure of many of both brands' distribution centres. Kays main centres in Worcester and Leeds were closed, while Littlewoods main operations in Liverpool were cut back.

Index was closed in early 2005, and at the time of its failure, it was noted that it had not made a profit for 18 out of its 20 years of operation and was running at a loss of £100 million. Half of its standalone stores were sold to rival Argos and concessions in its Littlewoods stores were shut.

The closure of 119 Littlewoods stores was also announced in 2005. Around 40 stores were sold to the Primark retail business, owned by ABF.

=== Football pools ===
Littlewoods pools business was the first to be established and grew into the biggest football pools business in the world. It went on to become the first sponsor of the FA Cup and its winners were often celebrated – notably Viv Nicholson, whose experience was immortalised in the book, play, and musical Spend, Spend, Spend. In June 1961, Littlewoods took over Sherman's Pools. The launch of the National Lottery in 1994 led to a major advertising campaign to distinguish Littlewoods Pools from other forms of betting and this proved successful in the short term. In 2000, The Moores family sold the Littlewoods Pools business to Rodime, a shell business part owned by Bank of Scotland. At that stage, Littlewoods' football pools still had a million people playing a week and the sale, for £160m, included its online venture bet247.co.uk and its phone betting arm Bet Direct. The terms of the deal enabled the Littlewoods name to be used for a further ten years.

=== Fire at Littlewoods building ===
On 2 September 2018, the Littlewoods Pools building, the former headquarters of Littlewoods Pools caught fire. There were no reported injuries, the building having stood empty since 2003.
