= Brecqhou =

Islet off the west coast of Sark in the Channel Islands

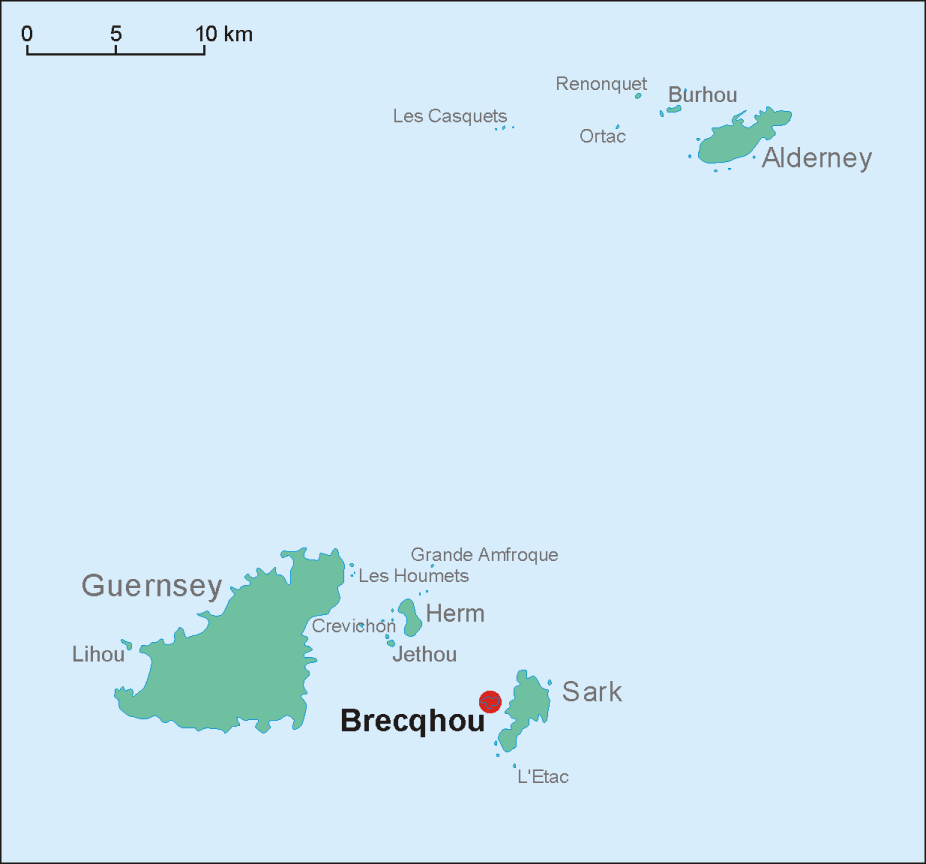
- This is a map of the Bailiwick of Guernsey; Brecqhou is off the west coast of Sark

Geography
- Coordinates: 49°25′56″N 02°23′17″W
- Archipelago: Channel Islands
- Adjacent to: English Channel
- Area: 74 acres (30 ha)

Administration
- Bailiwick of Guernsey
- Jurisdiction: Sark

Demographics
- Population: 1

Brecqhou (or Brechou; French pronunciation: [bʁɛku]) is one of the Channel Islands, located off the west coast of Sark where they are now geographically detached from each other. Brecqhou is politically part of both Sark and the Bailiwick of Guernsey. It has been established in the courts that Brecqhou is a tenement of Sark. The Ministry of Justice, the department of the United Kingdom government with responsibility for the Channel Islands, considers Brecqhou part of Sark.

== Name ==
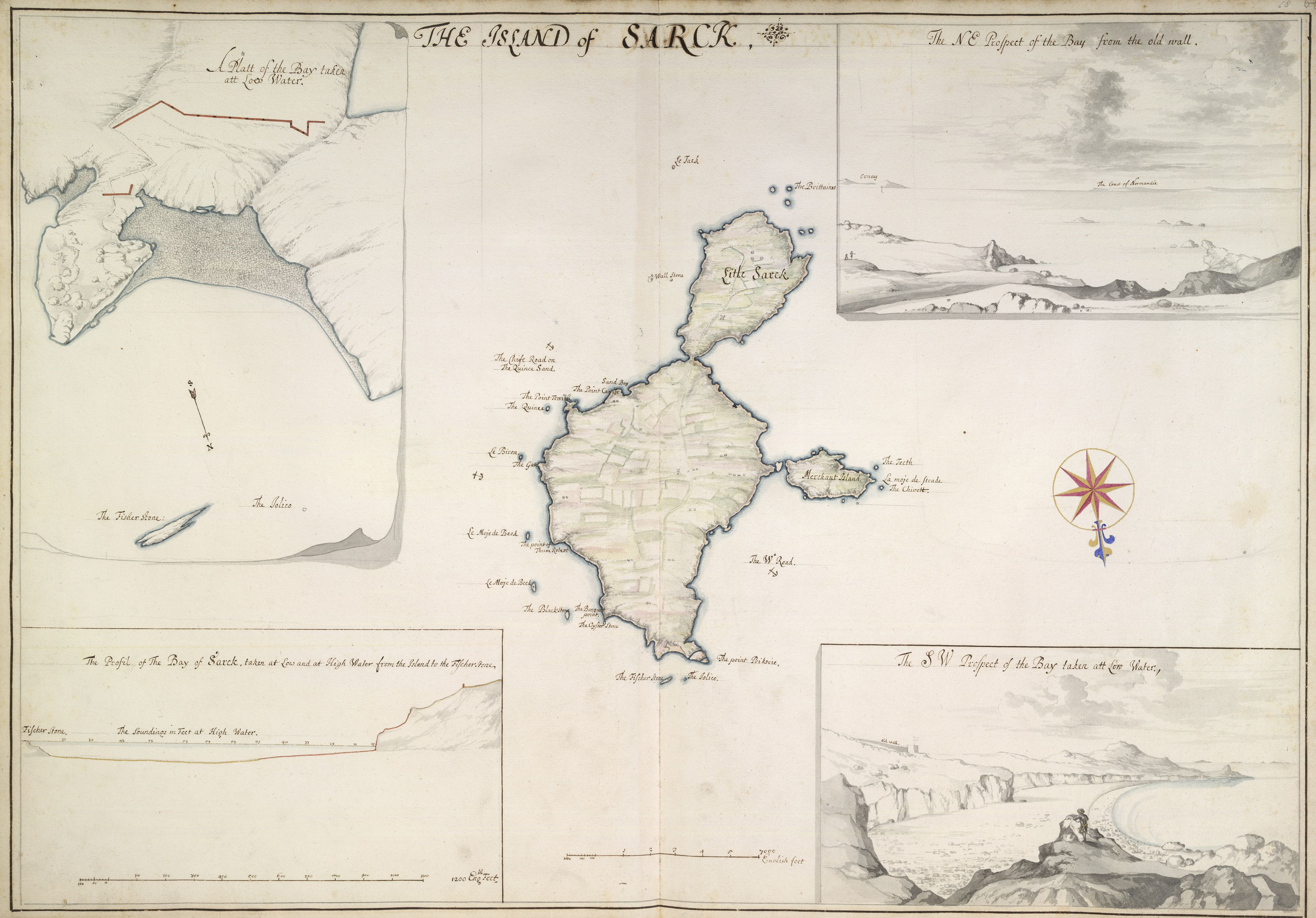
1680 map of Sark and "Merchant's Island" (Brecquou); South is on top, so Brecqhou is located to the right (west) of Sark.

The name Brecqhou derives from the Old Norse brekka (slope or escarpment; compare Bricquebec) and holmr (island or islet; see -hou). It was also formerly known as "Merchant's Island" (L'Isle aux Marchands). The spellings Brechou, Brehou, Brehoe appear on old maps.

== Geography ==
A mere islet, Brecqhou has a surface area of just 74 acres (30 ha). The island is separated from Sark by an extremely narrow sound (Le Goulliot Passage) which can be perilous for rowers. It is traversed frequently by yachts during summer and by fishing boats year round and even forms a part of the route taken by occasional powerboating events in the islands.

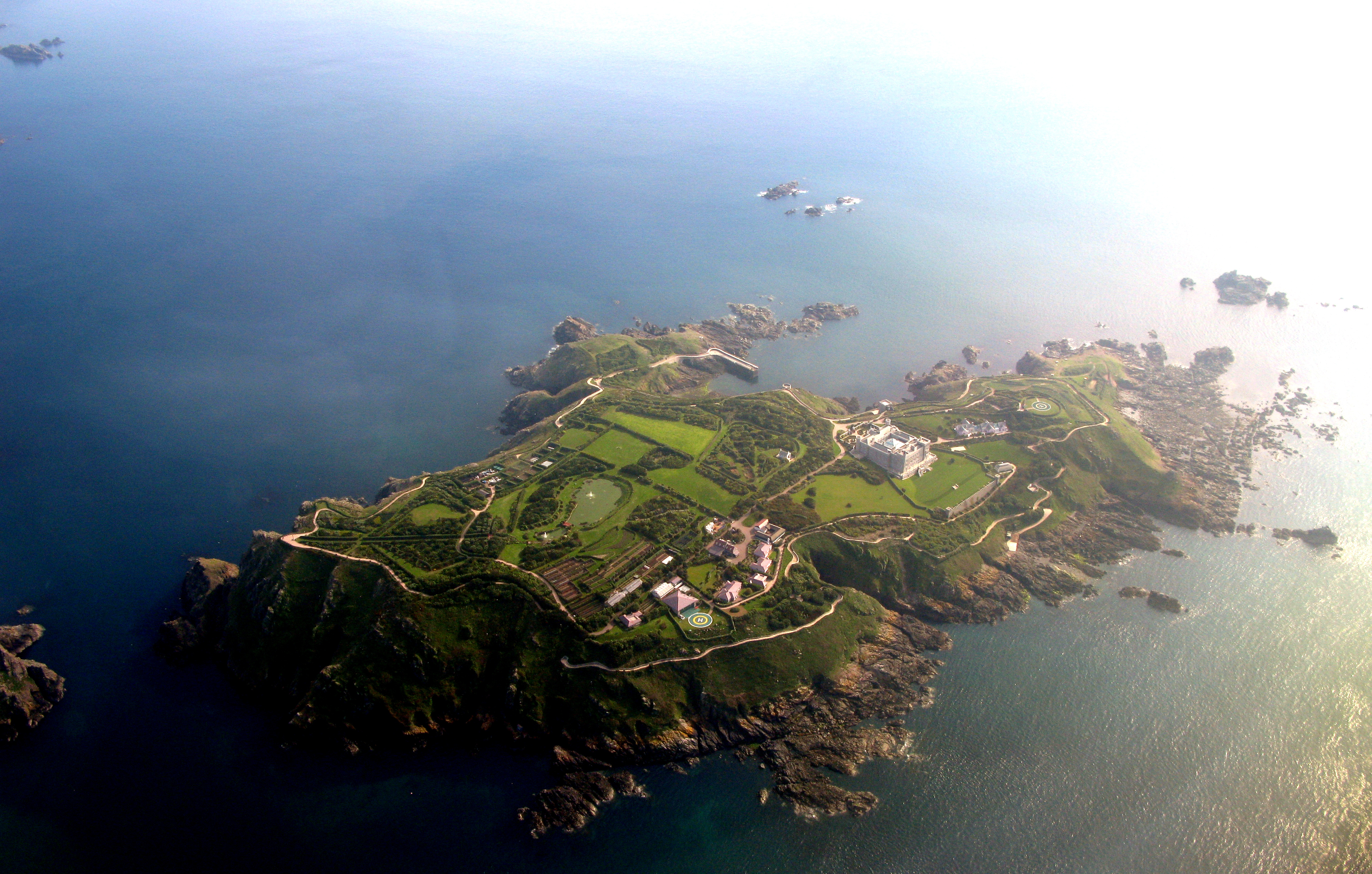
An aerial view of Brecqhou

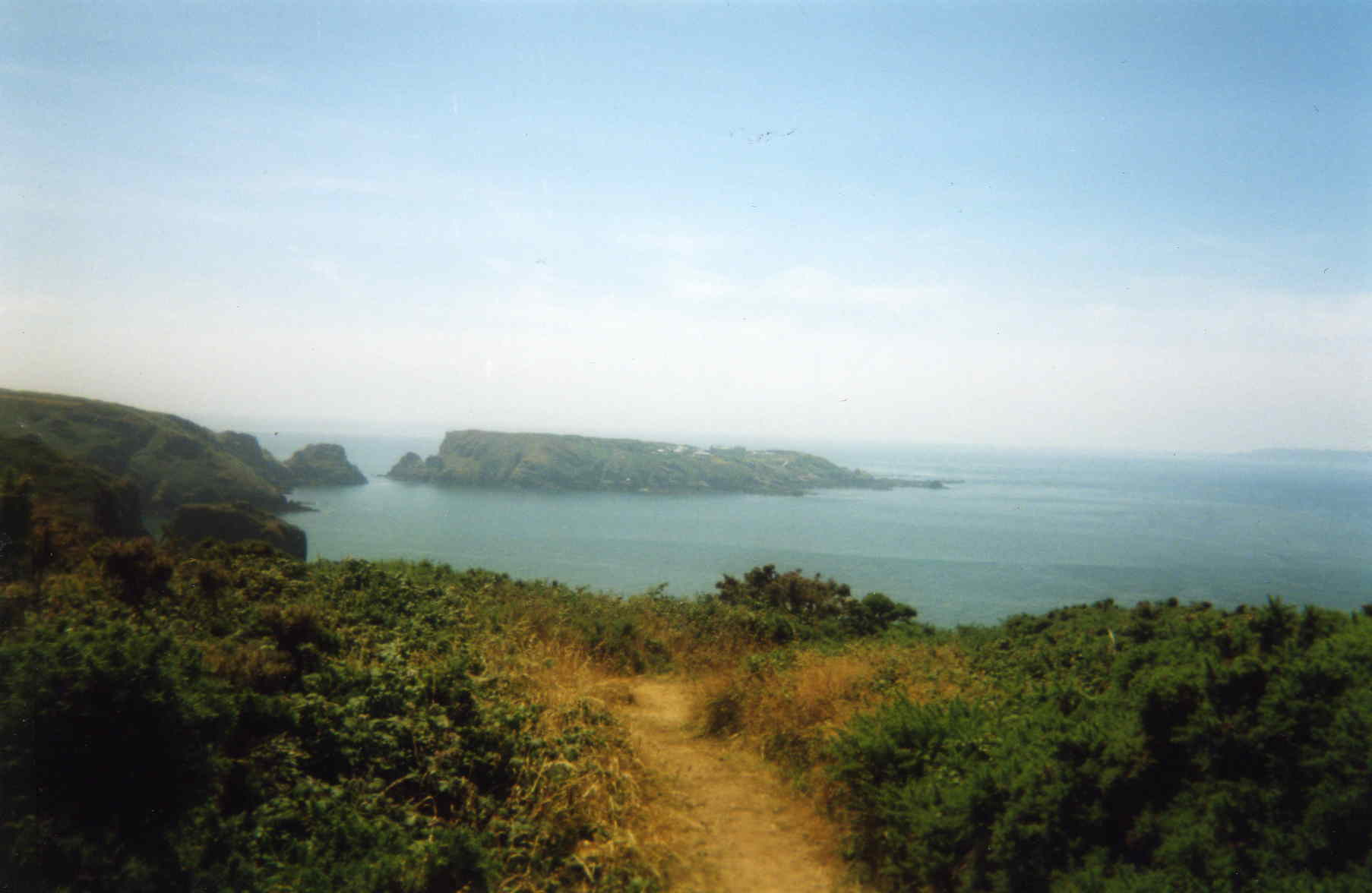
A view of Brecqhou, from the north of Sark

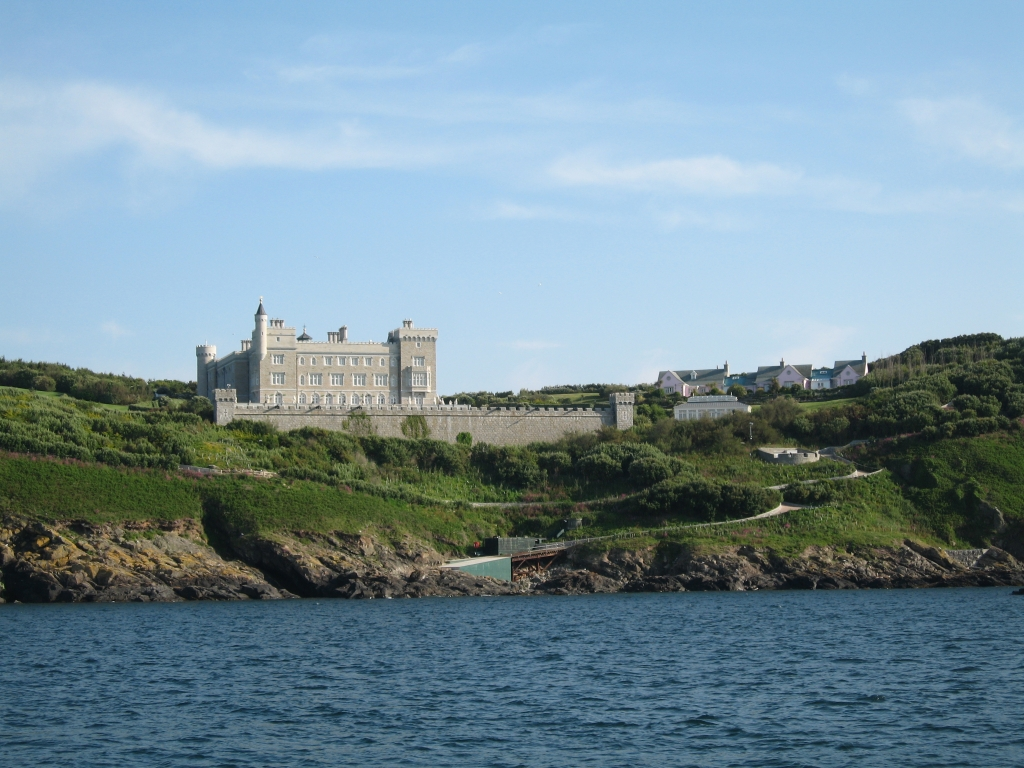
The Barclay Brothers completed building the castle on Brecqhou in 1996.

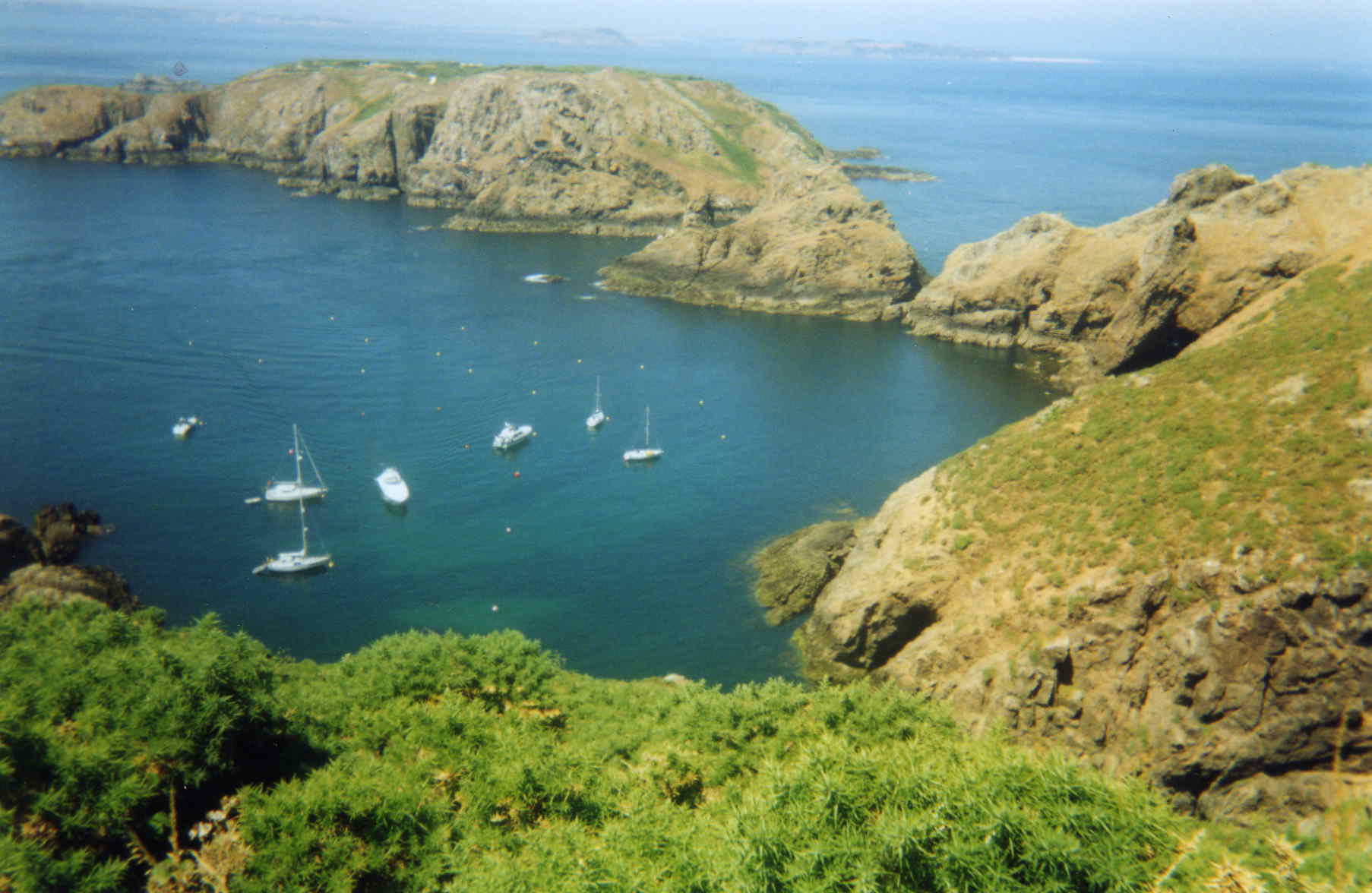
A view of Brecqhou, from the southeast

== Feudal relationship with Sark ==
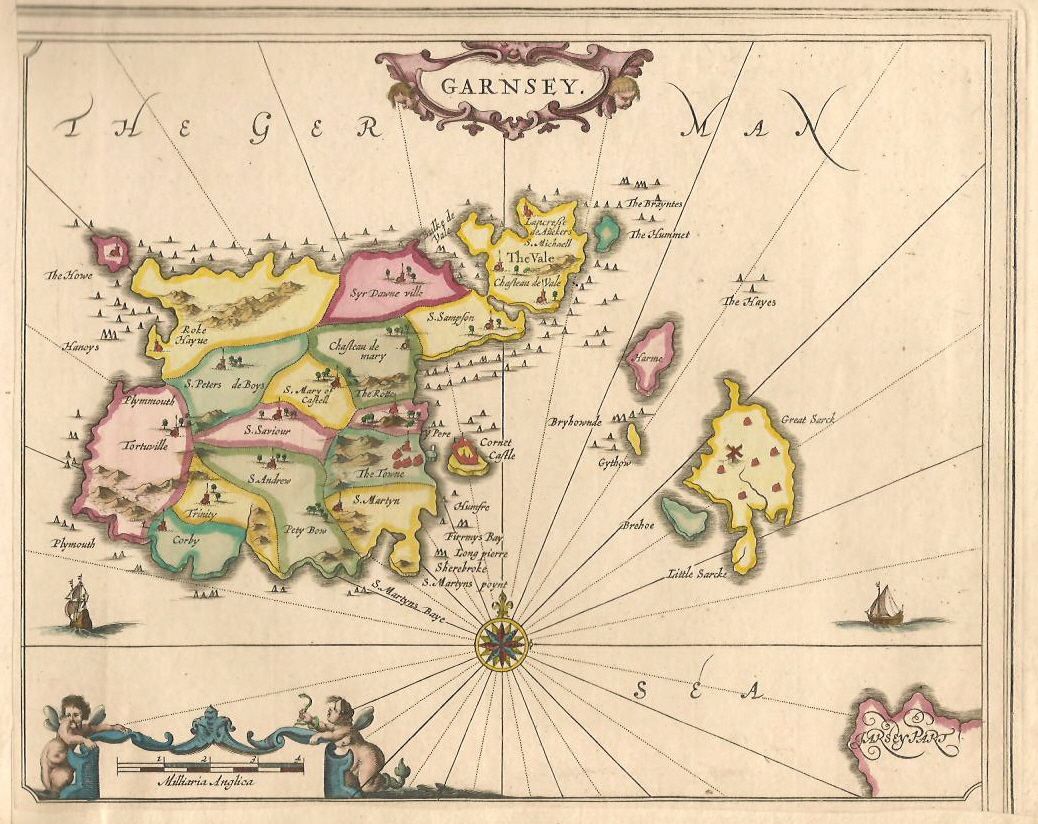
Map c. 1800 of the Bailiwick of Guernsey (Garnsey), with Sarck (yellow) and Brehoe (green) visible in the east.

In Sark, the word tenant is used, and often pronounced as in French, in the sense of feudal landholder rather than the common English meaning of lessee. The landholdings of Sark are held by 40 tenants representing the parcels of the 40 families who colonised Sark. As explained on the Sark government website: "There is no true freehold, all land being held on perpetual lease (fief) from the Seigneur, and the 40 properties (Tenements) into which the Island is divided (as well as a few other holdings in perpetual fief) can only pass by strict rules of inheritance or by sale." The relevance of the seigneurial privileges and duties that distinguish feudal from civil landowning has decreased as most of the duties relate to agriculture and defence.

Since 1929, the island has been connected to the title of the tenement La Moinerie de Haut, one of the 40 tenements whose owner had to keep a gun for the defence of the fief and, until forfeit in 2008, had a seat in the Chief Pleas. Originally, La Moinerie de Haut, named after the medieval monastery whose site is close to it, was a parcel of land in northwest Sark that was, at that time, owned by the Seigneur himself. When Sibyl Hathaway sold the island of Brecqhou to Angelo Clarke in 1929, she transferred that seat in the Chief Pleas to unrepresented Brecqhou. This was scant loss for her, as she owned more than one tenement and every member of the Chief Pleas was entitled to only one vote.

From 1993, the tenement of Brecqhou was owned by the Barclay brothers, the co-owners of The Daily Telegraph newspaper and former co-owners of The Scotsman. The brothers bought the island for £2.3 million in September 1993. Under the Reform (Sark) Law 1951, the tenant was David Barclay. After assuming ownership, the brothers had intermittent legal disputes with the government of Sark, and expressed a desire to make Brecqhou politically independent. They drove cars on the island and had a helicopter, both of which are banned under Sark law.

- Customary and express written rule of Sark over Brecqhou may be evidenced in the retention of all seigneurial rights per the sale instrument from the Dame (female Seigneur) of Sark, Hathaway, to Clarke in 1929.
- According to the Barclays this retention was invalid, as Brecqhou may not have been part of the fief of Sark. They cited facts such as that the letters patent establishing the fief do not mention the smaller island. While the Seigneur in long succession came to own Brecqhou (not before 1681), they cited practices and acts to suggest Brecqhou may not have been merged into the fief of Sark. Therefore the claim runs that the Seigneur could not legally hold the privileges valid elsewhere such as might survive sale, whatever its terms.

This conflict caused a lawsuit (1996–2000) and the founding in 2006 of a Brecqhou liaison sub-committee of Sark's Chief Pleas.

David Barclay died in January 2021, leaving his brother as the sole tenant of Brecqhou.

=== Tenants ===
- 1929–1932: Angelo Clarke
- 1932–1944: Thomas Arthur Clarke (1871–1944; left the island 20 June 1940)
- 1949–1966: John Thomson Donaldson
- 1966–1987: Leonard Joseph Matchan
- 1987–1992: Susan Groves (not recognised by Seigneur of Sark)
- 1993–2021: David and Frederick Barclay
- 2021–present: Frederick Barclay

== Fort Brecqhou ==
The Barclays demolished the manor house and caused a very large concrete and granite building to be erected, Fort Brecqhou or "the castle". The architect was Quinlan Terry; it cost £60 million, required just under 120,000 tonnes of material to be brought to Brecqhou, and a number of environmental challenges had to be addressed. People who are staying in the Barclays' hotel on Sark may visit; taking photographs is not allowed. Facilities include a football pitch, a crypt, a pub for staff, and 22 cannon. It has been described by the architectural historian David Watkin as "the largest house built in Britain for at least two centuries".

== Flag and stamps ==
Coat of arms of Matchan

Personal flag of Matchan, formerly considered unofficial flag of Brecqhou

The former tenant, Leonard Joseph Matchan, had devised a personal flag (identical to the Sark flag, with the exception that the Matchan coat of arms was emblazoned on the bottom right). Although frequently considered the island flag, this was only a personal flag, and is no longer in use.

The flag has since been adapted to equate with the current tenant, Sir Frederick Barclay. The current flag of Brecqhou remains in the same format as the previous flag, but replaces the Matchan coat of arms with the twins' coats of arms in the bottom right.

Leonard Joseph Matchan issued postage stamps (labelled "Brechou") on 30 September 1969, but they were suppressed the following day by the Guernsey Post Office when they took over responsibility from Royal Mail for the issue of stamps. Matchan occupied Brecqhou until his death on 6 October 1987. The current tenants issued stamps annually between 1999 and 2013.

== Public visits ==
In 2012, it was reported that the island is open to the public, by prior arrangement.
