= Press Holdings =

Two holding companies owned by the Barclay brothers, registered in Jersey

Press Holdings and May Corporation Limited are two Jersey-registered holding companies owned by Frederick Barclay, which control the UK holding company Press Acquisitions Limited, which in turn owns the Telegraph Media Group, parent company of The Daily Telegraph and The Sunday Telegraph.

In December 2005, Press Holdings sold The Scotsman Publications to the Edinburgh-based Johnston Press for £160m, having paid £82m for the group in 1995.

The company formerly owned The Spectator, a weekly British political magazine, and Apollo, an art magazine.

In July 2023, it was announced that Mike McTighe had been appointed chairman of Press Holdings and May Corporation Limited in order to oversee the sale of the Telegraph and the Spectator Magazine.

The disposal of The Spectator and Apollo was completed in September 2024.

In March 2026, Axel Springer SE agreed to buy Telegraph Media Group in a £575 million deal.
