= Index (retailer) =

British retailer

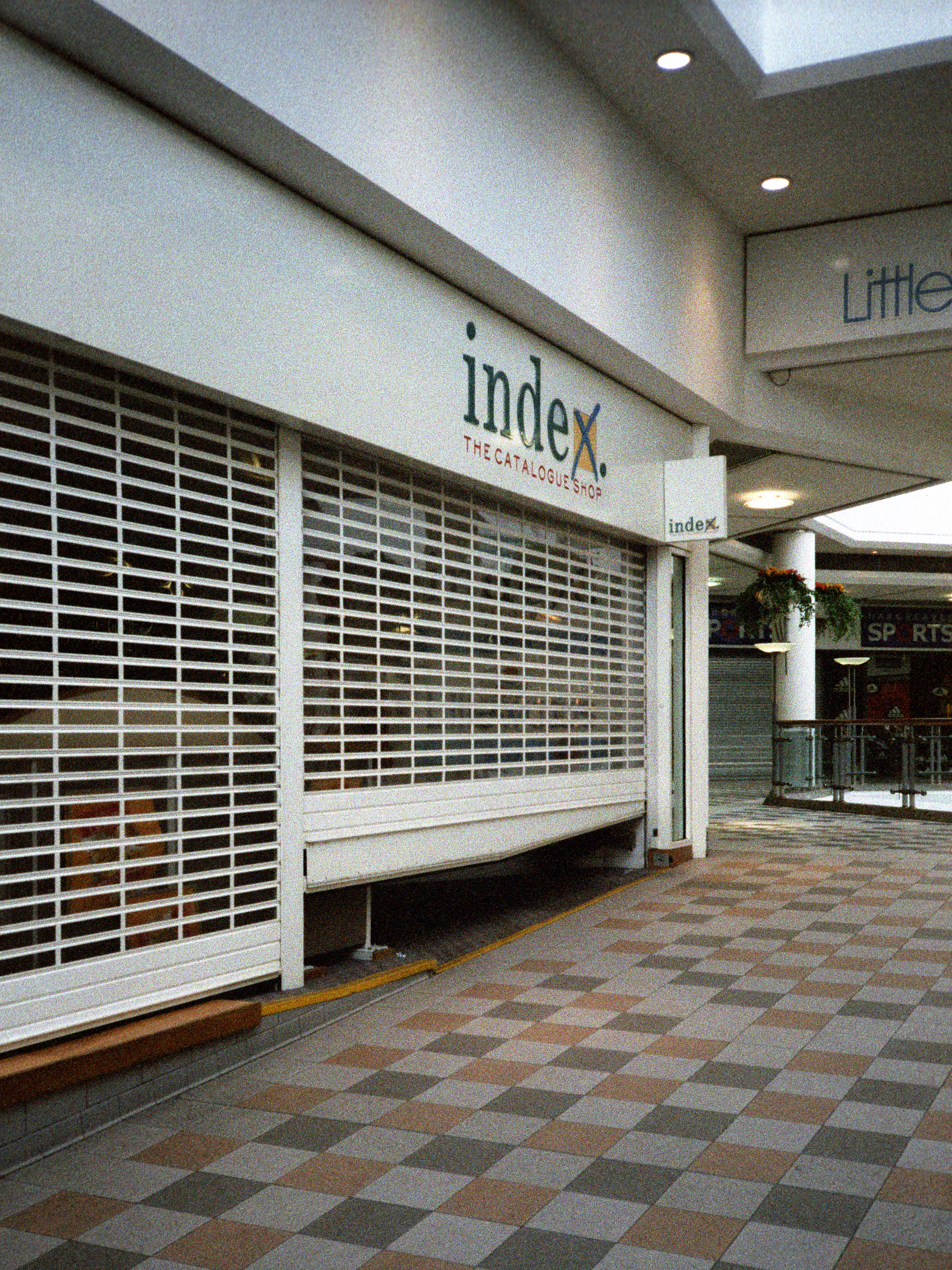
- Index, The Catalogue Shop in Sutton, 1999
- Type: Subsidiary
- Founded: 1985; 41 years ago
- Defunct: 2005
- Successor: Argos
- Products: Consumer goods
- Owner: Littlewoods (1985–2005)

Index was a catalogue retailer in the United Kingdom, which was owned by Littlewoods from 1985 until 2005. Many Index stores were attached to Littlewoods stores. It was a well known retailer in the 1980s and the 1990s, but sales declined in the noughties and it lost many customers to its main rival, Argos.

Index failed to make a profit in eighteen of its twenty years of retailing, losing more than £100 million in total.

== Rebranding ==
In December 2000, following a half-year loss of £15.6 million, Littlewoods announced that of its 98 standalone Index stores, five were to be closed outright, 35 were to be moved into Littlewoods stores and rebranded as Littlewoods eXtra, and 58 would remain standalone but be rebranded as Littlewoods Index.

== Closure ==
In 2005, Littlewoods announced the closure of all its eponymous high street stores, which also meant the closure of any Index branches that shared their location with a Littlewoods department store. The company closed all Index branches in April 2005. Around half of the standalone Index branches, 33 in total, were sold to GUS plc, and around 800 Index employees were transferred to Argos.

Argos also acquired the rights to Index.co.uk and the Index brand.
