= David and Frederick Barclay =

British businessmen; twin brothers (born 1934)

Sir David Barclay and Sir Frederick Barclay
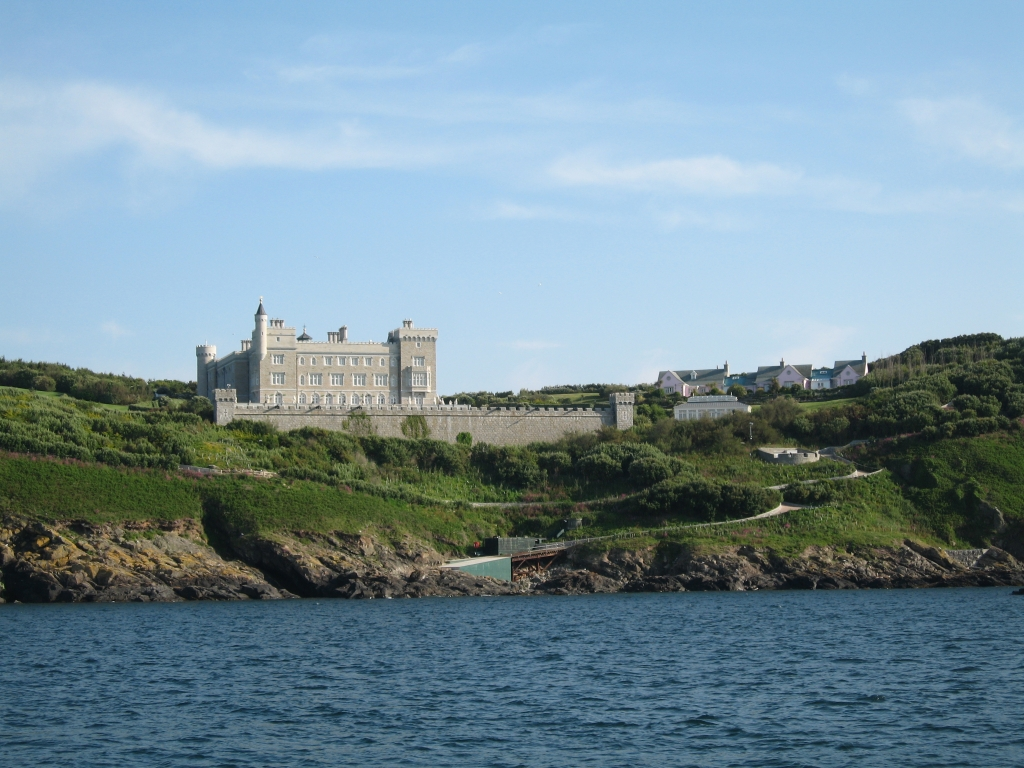
- Brecqhou – Barclay brothers' castle
- Born: David: David Rowat Barclay; 27 October 1934 Frederick: Frederick Hugh Barclay; 27 October 1934 (age 92); Hammersmith, London, England
- Died: David: 10 January 2021 (aged 86)
- Occupation: Businessmen

Sir David Rowat Barclay (27 October 1934 – 10 January 2021) and Sir Frederick Hugh Barclay (born 27 October 1934), commonly referred to as the "Barclay Brothers" or "Barclay Twins", were British billionaire brothers, of whom Frederick Barclay is now the sole survivor. They were identical twins and, until David's death in 2021, had joint business interests primarily in media, retail and property.

The Sunday Times Rich List of 2020 estimated their wealth at £7 billion. They earned a reputation for avoiding publicity and have often been described as reclusive.

David's son, Aidan, manages their UK businesses. Their businesses have been accused of tax avoidance, by placing assets under ownership of companies registered abroad and controlled through trusts. Their Press Holdings company formerly controlled Telegraph Group Limited, parent company of The Daily Telegraph and The Sunday Telegraph. These were sold to Axel Springer. It also formerly owned Apollo and The Spectator magazines.

In 1993, the brothers bought the lease of the island of Brecqhou, one of the smallest of the Channel Islands, just off the coast of Sark.

== Biography ==
The Barclay brothers were born within ten minutes of each other in Hammersmith, London, to Scottish parents Beatrice Cecilia (née Taylor; died 1989) and her husband, Frederick Hugh Barclay, a travelling salesman. The couple had eight other children. Frederick Sr. died when the brothers were twelve years old, and they left school four years later in 1950 to work in the accounts department at the General Electric Company before setting up as painters and decorators.

In 1955, David married Zoe Newton, who had trained as a ballet dancer, at St John the Baptist Church, Holland Road, Kensington. Zoe Barclay pursued a modelling career and became the most photographed and highest paid model in Britain of her time, appearing on the front of popular magazines such as Picturegoer. She appeared on television and in the Dairy Council advertisements as the "drinka pinta milka day" girl.

By the end of the 1950s, the brothers were running Candy Corner, tobacconists and confectioners, on the edge of Kensington. However, in November 1960 the business folded when Frederick and Douglas were made bankrupt at the High Court after their landlord seized the shop because they were in breach of the terms of the lease. A notice in The London Gazette at that time announced the bankruptcies, listing a former business interest of Frederick, then aged 26, and Douglas, two years his junior, as builders and decorators called Barclay Brothers based at the Barclay family home.

Meanwhile, David was registered as a director of Hillgate Estate Agents in 1962, with his wife Zoe as a co-director; she had given up her modelling career to concentrate on her young sons. By 1968, however, Frederick was running the family businesses, replacing Zoe on the Hillgate board. He had obtained the discharge of his bankruptcy after David paid the creditors. During this time they redeveloped old boarding houses in London, and made them into hotels.

Between 1968 and 1974, the twins received increasingly large loans from the Crown Agents, a government agency designed to help the colonies and developing countries do business in Britain. In 1970, they bought Gestplan Hotels, which operated the Londonderry House Hotel in Park Lane, from a group of Lebanese bankers.

In the mid-1970s, Frederick met and married Hiroko Asada (née Kuzusaka), a familiar figure among Japanese society in London. She had a son from her previous marriage, and later had a daughter, Amanda. Meanwhile David married Reyna Oropeza, with whom he had a fourth son in 1989, named Alistair.

From the late 1960s onwards, the Barclay brothers continued to build up stakes in businesses such as breweries and casinos. In 1975, they bought the Howard Hotel, overlooking the Thames at Temple Place. In 1983, they bought Ellerman, the brewing and shipping group, for £45m. They later sold its brewing division for £240m. They used the proceeds to buy the Ritz Hotel in London's Piccadilly in 1995. They spent £370 million on Gotaas-Larsen, a Bermuda-based shipping company, and £200 million on the Automotive Financial Group, a motor retail chain in 1994. The brothers were involved in philanthropy, and were knighted in 2000 for their support of medical research, to which they have donated an estimated £40 million between 1987 and 2000.

In 2004 they were listed in 42nd place with an estimate of £750 million on The Sunday Times Rich List, and in 2006 they were ranked 24th with a value of £1,800m. In 2012, they topped the Media Rich List with an estimate of £2.25 billion.

David died aged 86 on 10 January 2021, after a short illness.

In May 2021, the court ordered Frederick to pay his wife, Hiroko, £100 million on a divorce she had initiated; the judge criticised Frederick for selling a yacht contrary to court orders. The court said he had "completely ignored those orders, sold the yacht, and applied the equity for his own use. I regarded that behaviour as reprehensible" ... "[He] is a public figure who should have been aware of the potential consequences of disobedience of court orders and his behaviour in the proceedings should not be allowed to pass completely under the radar”. On 28 July 2022, a high court judge ruled that Frederick's ex-wife of 34 years had failed to prove he was in contempt of court for not paying her a £100 million divorce settlement. However, he was told he faced a potential jail sentence after a judge found him in contempt of court for failing to pay his ex-wife £245,000 in legal fees and monthly maintenance costs.

== Business interests ==
=== Hotels ===
- the London Ritz (1995-2020)

=== Shipping ===
==== Ellerman Lines (1983–1985) ====
In 1983, the brothers purchased brewing and shipping group Ellerman for £45m. They later sold its brewing division (for £240m), and in late 1985 its shipping business (to its management). The Ellerman deal helped the Barclays develop the strategy of buying companies, breaking them up and profiting from the real estate. The technique of approaching an insider to obtain an advantage also set a precedent for later deals: the Barclays approached the Ellerman non-executive chairman, David Scott, at a secret meeting in Monte Carlo. Scott recalled in his memoirs that David Barclay requested an exclusive option to buy the firm, and to keep it secret from all but two directors, in return for a promise that Scott would stay on as non-executive chairman. However, moments after signing the sale document, Scott was handed a letter (by the Barclays' lawyer) demanding his immediate resignation on grounds that he had been indiscreet about the offer.

=== Retail ===
==== The Very Group and Littlewoods ====
In 2002, the brothers purchased the Liverpool-based retail company Littlewoods from its founders, the Moores family, for £750 million. The deal was bankrolled by HBOS, which also took a 5% equity stake in the brothers' bidding vehicle, LW Investments. The brothers merged the company with their earlier purchase, The Very Group, to form Littlewoods Shop Direct Home Shopping Limited, which operates a majority share of the United Kingdom's home shopping market. They also closed and sold off the Littlewoods department store chain, with the largest parcel of 120 properties being purchased by Associated British Foods for leasing mainly to its subsidiary Primark, while other stores were leased to Marks & Spencer, New Look and British Home Stores.

Two years after the brothers' acquisition of Littlewoods Ltd., HM Revenue and Customs repaid the company VAT that it had charged in breach of EU law. Since October 2004, more than £200 million in overpaid VAT and £268 million in simple interest was repaid to the company. However, Littlewoods argued that the company was owed a compounded interest rate and subsequently sued HMRC for £1 billion.

In 2024, Very Group auditors, Deloitte, resigned after stating they struggled to access "appropriate and relevant information in respect of certain financing arrangements between companies in the wider group". Very Group's ownership is spread across many different companies, some unaudited, with an ultimate offshore owner.

==== Yodel ====
Delivery company Yodel has received criticism for its poor service in the past, but has improved over recent years. Yodel (which operates via Home Delivery Network Ltd.) suffered a £130 million loss in 2011.

==== handbag.com (1999–2006) ====
In October 2006, the Barclays sold handbag.com for £22 million. This was almost all profit: they acquired the website after it was set up as a joint venture between Hollinger International and the Boots Group in 1999. The Handbag group was a collection of four websites designed for female users: the high fashion getlippy.com, the fashion and home life-focused allaboutyou.com, a "specialist pregnancy site" gomamatoday.com and handbag.com.

==== Woolworths and Ladybird brands (2009–2021) ====
On 2 February 2009, it was announced that the brothers' Shop Direct Group had purchased the brand names of Woolworths and Ladybird children's clothing for an undisclosed amount, from Deloitte, the administrators of the failed Woolworths Group. In July 2021, the British and Irish Woolworths brands would be sold to Woolworth in Germany, with The Very Group retaining the Ladybird brand.

=== Newspapers ===
Many of the brothers' publishing interests are owned through a Jersey company, Press Holdings.

==== The European (1992–1998) ====
In 1992, the Barclay brothers entered the newspaper publishing industry by buying The European newspaper, formerly part of Robert Maxwell's holdings. The weekly paper became a high-end business tabloid, but closed in 1998.

==== The Scotsman (1995–2005) ====
In 1995, they bought The Scotsman newspaper, and in 1996 appointed former Sunday Times editor Andrew Neil to oversee their publishing interests. On 19 December 2005, the Barclays sold The Scotsman Publications Ltd, itself then part of Press Holdings Group, for £160 million to Johnston Press. The Barclays had owned these publications for a decade, and said they intended to use the capital raised on their other interests. During their ownership of The Scotsman, the newspaper had seven editors in nine years (see The Scotsman: Editors).

==== Sunday Business (1998–2008) ====
In 1998 they bought and relaunched the Sunday Business newspaper with editor Jeff Randall. It became a weekly magazine The Business in 2006, and was merged into The Spectator in 2008.

==== The Telegraph Media Group (2004–2025) ====
In July 2004, the Barclays bought The Telegraph Group (now Telegraph Media Group), which includes The Daily Telegraph, The Sunday Telegraph, and The Spectator after months of intense bidding and lawsuits. The Telegraph Group was owned by Hollinger Inc. of Toronto, Ontario, Canada, the newspaper group controlled by the Canadian-born British businessman Conrad Black. As part of a February 2004 judgment, an American judge, Leo Strine, accused the Barclay brothers of being "less than fully candid", adding they had "remained silent while Lord Black misled the Hollinger Inc. International board", remarks that incurred the brothers' wrath, with David branding the criticisms "grossly unfair".

The brothers' period as newspaper proprietors was more tumultuous than with their property interests. At the Telegraph Group, Murdoch MacLennan made over 100 journalists redundant in 2006, prompting the National Union of Journalists (NUJ) to consider strike action. The Sunday Telegraph editor Dominic Lawson was sacked and replaced by Sarah Sands in June 2005, but Sands lasted just nine months. Patience Wheatcroft from The Times was appointed editor in March 2006. She was replaced by Ian McGregor one year later. Jason Seiken was made editor-in-chief and chief content officer of Telegraph Media Group in October 2013, but announced his departure after 18 months in April 2015, three months after Peter Oborne, the Chief Political Correspondent, resigned from the newspaper in protest at its editorial direction.

In October 2019, it was announced that the brothers were seeking to sell the Telegraph Group amid speculation that their business interests were in some difficulty.

On 7 June 2023, after a bitter row over nearly £1bn of unpaid debts, the Daily and Sunday Telegraph, amongst others, were put up for sale by AlixPartners, who had been appointed by Bank of Scotland as official receiver to seize the shares owned by the Barclay family in the holding company that ultimately controlled the national newspapers and The Spectator magazine.

In 2024 The Spectator was sold to a vehicle owned by Sir Paul Marshall for £100m.

The Telegraph property was eventually sold in 2025 to the American firm RedBird Capital Partners, after a prior bid for control by the Abu Dhabi Sheikh Mansour bin Zayed Sultan al-Nahyan experienced regulatory problems and was the instigator for a law preventing foreign ownership of the UK press, the Digital Markets, Competition and Consumers Act 2024.

== Controversies ==
=== Fraud and tax avoidance ===
In 2024, The Economist reported on strong grounds that the Barclay brothers engaged in fraud and tax avoidance or evasion in relation to a deal in the 1970s that saved the brothers from bankruptcy. The Economist also found that Frederick Barclay concealed assets from a bankruptcy court, which is a crime.

=== Tax exile accusation ===
The Guardian has stated that the brothers are tax exiles, and they reside in the Avenue de Grande Bretagne, Monte Carlo. They operate their businesses from an office in the United Kingdom. When asked if he was a tax exile, Frederick stated that he lived abroad for health reasons. The corporate tax arrangements of the Ritz Hotel, purchased and refurbished by the brothers in 1995, were the subject of a December 2012 investigation by BBC's Panorama current affairs television programme, which found the hotel had paid no corporation tax in the UK for 17 years, after legally claiming reliefs.

=== Sark and Brecqhou disputes ===
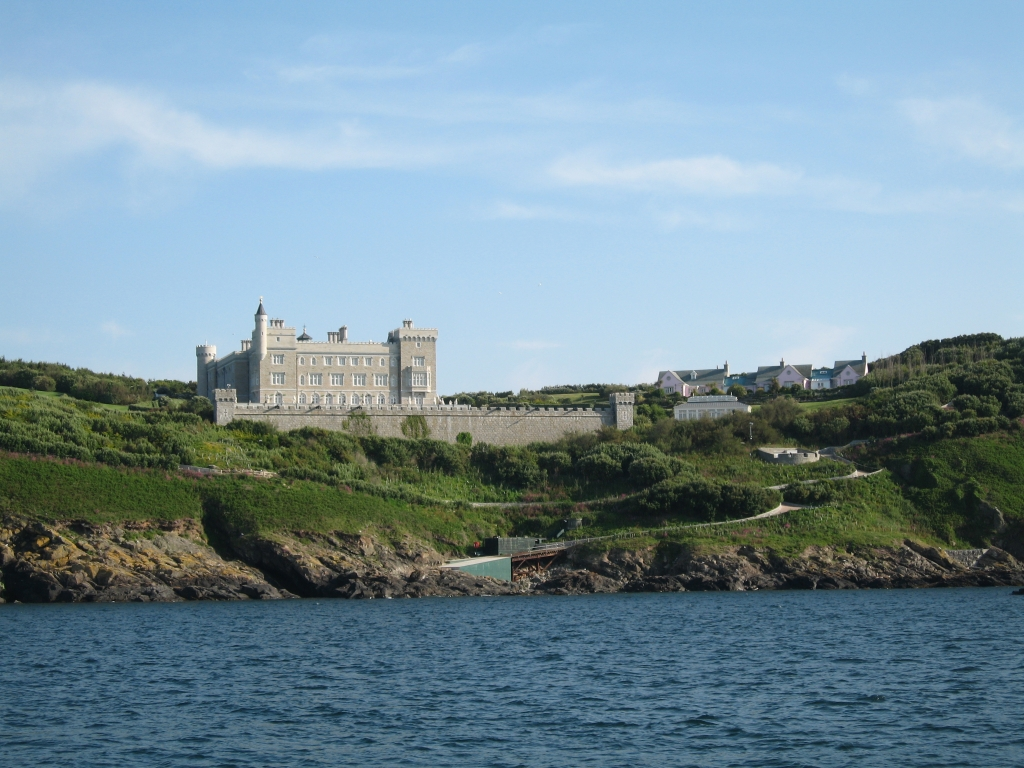
The Barclay Brothers' castle, Brecqhou

In 1993, the Barclay brothers bought the tenement of the island of Brecqhou, a small sister island of Sark, one of the Channel Islands. Their mock-Gothic castle on Brecqhou, designed by Quinlan Terry, features 100-foot (30 m) granite walls, battlements, two swimming pools and a helicopter pad. Since their purchase of the tenement of Brecqhou, the Barclays have been in several legal disputes with the government of Sark over such issues as the Barclays' violation of Sark's law banning motor cars. They have also expressed a desire to make Brecqhou politically independent from Sark – building on the research of William Toplis, the painter, and others, who argued that Brecqhou was not a part of the fief of Sark.

In the mid-1990s, the brothers petitioned the European Court of Human Rights in Strasbourg, France, challenging Sark's inheritance law, which mandated their island be left to David's oldest son. The brothers wanted to will their estate equally to their four children. Sark's legislature decided to amend the inheritance law, allowing residents to leave property to any one or more of their children. In 2002, the brothers claimed their property tax was too high, particularly since they maintained Brecqhou's paths and dock. Fearing more litigation, Sark officials cut the Barclays' tax rate.

In 2008 (partially due to legal activity by the Barclay brothers), Sark dismantled its 443-year-old feudal system of government on the premise that this was necessary to comply with the European Convention on Human Rights. On 16 January 2008 and 21 February 2008, the Chief Pleas approved a law which introduced a 30-member chamber, with 28 members elected in Island-wide elections, one hereditary member and one member appointed for life. On 9 April 2008, the Privy Council approved the Sark law reforms, and the first elections under the new law were held in December 2008.

On 11 December 2008, the Barclay brothers were in the news for pulling out their investments (which included hotels) from the island of Sark, causing 170 staff to be made redundant, after local voters did not support candidates championed by the Barclay brothers. The brothers had previously warned that if the voters chose to bring back the 'establishment' Sark leaders that are still aligned with the feudal lord then they would pull out of Sark.

After the 2008 election, the brothers claimed that the presence of two unelected figures on Sark's government – the seigneur and the seneschal, the local judge – was unjustifiable. They took their fight to the Supreme Court of the United Kingdom, arguing that the two roles break human rights laws that protect the rights of citizens to elect lawmakers. Their challenge was dismissed, but the Barclays said they would continue to fight, taking their case to the European Court of Human Rights in Strasbourg.

On 28 March 2012, BBC Radio 4 dedicated part of its Today programme to analysis of the Barclay brothers' role in Sark. It reported that the islanders were protesting against bullying and intimidation by representatives of the Barclays after a story in their local paper had prompted the only doctor to leave the island. The doctor had used a boat rather than the Barclays' helicopter to transport a patient who was having a seizure to hospital on Guernsey, which was reported in the Barclays' paper as negligent. Despite support from the patient's family and the local BMA, the doctor left Sark after the story, leaving the island without a doctor.

=== Ritz Hotel bugging ===
On 25 February 2020, the High Court in London was told that Frederick and his daughter Amanda were secretly recorded for several months after his nephews Alistair, Aidan and Howard bugged the conservatory of the Ritz Hotel, which at the time was co-owned by the brothers Barclay. Alistair Barclay had been seen handling an alleged bugging device. As of February 2020, Aidan Barclay, his son Andrew and two brothers face legal action for misuse of private information, breach of confidence and breach of data protection laws. CCTV footage released by Frederick to the media on 18 May 2020 shows Alistair Barclay handling the alleged bugging device in the conservatory "where Sir Frederick liked to conduct business meetings and smoke cigars." According to court documents, a second bug was supplied by Sir John Stevens' private investigation firm Quest Global Limited. This event led to the sale of the Ritz by the brothers later that year for around half the market value to Abdulhadi Mana al-Hajri, who is the brother-in-law of Qatar's ruler.
