= Spend Spend Spend =

- Original London production artwork
- Music: Steve Brown
- Lyrics: Steve Brown; Justin Greene
- Book: Steve Brown; Justin Greene
- Basis: The life of Viv Nicholson
- Premiere: 26 May 1998: West Yorkshire Playhouse, Leeds
- Productions: 1998 Leeds; 1999 West End; 2009 Newbury; 2024 Manchester

Spend Spend Spend is a musical with book and lyrics by Steve Brown and Justin Greene and music by Brown. The musical is inspired by the life of Viv Nicholson.

== Productions ==
=== Original Leeds production (1998) ===
Spend Spend Spend premiered on 26 May 1998, running until 27 June at the West Yorkshire Playhouse, Leeds and won the Barclays Theatre Award for Best Musical of the Year. The production starred Rosemary Ashe and Nigel Richards.

=== Original London production (1999) ===
After a week of previews, the West End production, directed by Jeremy Sams and choreographed by Craig Revel Horwood, opened on 12 October 1999 at the Piccadilly Theatre, where it ran until 5 August 2000. The original cast included Barbara Dickson, Steven Houghton, Jeff Shankley and Rachel Leskovac. The original London production was arranged by the musical director, Dane Preece.

A BBC Two documentary, Trouble at the Top, followed the progress of the production, particularly focusing on producer Andre Ptaszynski, and was broadcast in March 2000.

Shortly after closing in London, the production, with most of the original cast, went on a UK Tour. The Musical Director for the tour was Steve Hill and the role of Keith was played by Grant Anthony.

=== Newbury revival (2009) ===
On 8 July 2009 the Watermill Theatre, Newbury, presented a revival of the musical, directed by Craig Revel Horwood, with Karen Mann as the older Viv, Kirsty Hoiles as young Viv and Greg Barnett as Keith. The production next had a 7-week tour across the country, beginning 28 September 2010 to 9 November 2010. It was awarded the 2010 TMA award for Best Musical and Kirsty Hoiles (young Viv) was awarded the TMA award for Best Supporting Actress in a Musical.

=== Manchester revival (2024) ===
A new production at the Royal Exchange, Manchester ran from Saturday 23 November 2024 to Saturday 11 January 2025, directed by Josh Seymour, with Rachel Leskovac (nominated for an Olivier Award for her portrayal of the young Viv Nicholson in the original London production) in the leading role.

== Premise ==
In 1961, Yorkshire housewife Viv Nicholson wins £152,319 in the football pools. When a reporter asks her what she plans to do with her new fortune, she replies, "I'm going to spend, spend, spend!," which is exactly what she does. Her rags-to-riches-to-rags-again story takes her through five husbands, expensive sports cars, fur coats and jewelry, a battle with alcohol, and bankruptcy as, unable to cope with her new-found wealth and fame, she rapidly spirals downward.

== Awards and nominations ==
- Olivier Award
  - Laurence Olivier Award for Best Musical (nominee)
  - Laurence Olivier Award for Best Actress in a Musical (Dickson, winner)
  - Laurence Olivier Award for Best Actress in a Musical (Leskovac, nominee)
  - Laurence Olivier Award for Best Supporting Performance In A Musical (Houghton, nominee)
  - Laurence Olivier Award for Best Director (nominee)
  - Laurence Olivier Award for Best Choreography (nominee)
  - Laurence Olivier Award for Best Set Design (nominee)
  - Laurence Olivier Award for Best Lighting Designer (Mark Henderson, winner for multiple productions)
- Evening Standard Award for Best Musical, 1999 (winner)
- Critics Circle Award for Best Musical (winner)
