= Football pools =

Type of betting pool

The Totocalcio Logo.

In the United Kingdom, the football pools, often referred to as "the pools", is a betting pool based on predicting the outcome of association football matches taking place in the coming week. The pools are typically cheap to enter, and may encourage gamblers to enter several bets.

The traditional and most popular game was the Treble Chance, now branded the Classic Pools game. Players pick 10, 11 or 12 football games from the offered fixtures to finish as a draw, in which each team scores at least one goal. The player with the most accurate predictions wins the top prize, or a share of it if more than one player has these predictions. In addition, there is a special £3,000,000 prize or share of it for correctly predicting the nine score draws (draws of 1–1 or higher) when these are the only score draws on the coupon. Players can win large cash prizes in a variety of other ways, under a points-based scoring system.

Entries were traditionally submitted through the post or via agents, who collected entries throughout a specific area. It is now possible to play online.

Littlewoods, Vernons and Zetters were the largest pools companies. Littlewoods was the first company to provide pools, selling them outside Manchester United's Old Trafford ground in 1923. In 1986, a syndicate of players became the first winners of a prize over £1 million. The football pools companies have traditionally had a charitable element, donating over £1.1 billion to sports-related causes.

The pools business declined after the introduction of the National Lottery in 1994. Littlewoods, Vernons and Zetters were brought together in 2007 by Sportech under the brand 'The New Football Pools', now known as 'The Football Pools'. They offer other small stake, high prize games such as Premier 10 and Jackpot 12. In 2017 The Football Pools was sold to OpCapita, a private equity company, for £83 million.

== In the United Kingdom ==
=== Origins ===
Competitions for predicting the results of football matches are older than the football league itself. The Cricket and Football Field newspaper, in its edition of 10 September 1887, offered a prize of one guinea to "the Competitor who predicts the results" of four football matches to be played the following Saturday. Readers were invited to cut out and fill in a coupon printed in the newspaper, which had to be sent to the newspaper's offices by the Friday before the matches. If more than one "couponnier" predicted all four exact scores correctly, the prize would be shared between them. There was no charge for entry beyond postage; in fact readers were allowed to submit several coupons together, presumably in order to encourage them to purchase several copies of the newspaper. By 1910, The Umpire was offering a first prize of £300 for predicting six results.

In October 1922, John Moores, Colin Askham and Bill Hughes heard about John Jervis Barnard, a Birmingham man who had devised a 'football pool', where punters would bet on the outcome of football matches. The payouts to winners came from the 'pool' of money that was bet, less 10 per cent to cover "management costs". It had not been particularly successful and Barnard was struggling to make a profit. Hughes obtained one of Barnard's pools coupons; the three friends decided they could do it better and, on 1 February 1923, launched the Littlewood Football Pool (as it was originally known). A small office in Liverpool was rented and the first 4,000 coupons were distributed outside Manchester United's Old Trafford ground before one Saturday match that winter. Moores handed the coupons out himself, helped by some young boys eager to earn a few pennies.

It was not an instant success, as just 35 coupons were returned. With bets totalling £4 7s 6d (£4.37½), the 10 per cent deducted did not cover the three men's expenses. The winning dividend paid out £2 12s 0d (£2.60). They decided to print 10,000 coupons, and took them to Hull, where they were handed out before a big game. This time, only one coupon was returned. Midway through the 1924–25 football season the scheme was still losing money. The three young men had already invested £200 each, with no imminent prospect of things improving. Hughes suggested they cut their losses and forget the whole thing and Askham agreed. They expected Moores to concur, but instead he offered to return the £200 they had each invested in return for their shares, and they accepted. By 1930, Moores had become a millionaire from the competition.

In April 1929, Moores was prosecuted under the Ready Money Football Betting Act 1920. Following a court appearance, he was convicted. However, as his company never accepted cash, only postal orders that were cashed after the football results and the winning payout had been confirmed, his appeal was upheld.

=== Growth ===
Vernons' Pools was founded in 1925, also in Liverpool, and Zetters was founded 1933 in London. In 1934, the Football Pool Promoters' Association was formed: besides Littlewoods, Vernons and Zetters, its members were the other large pools companies including Cope's Pools (based in London), W.S. Murphy (Edinburgh) and Western Pools (Newport). A report by the Royal Commission at the time suggested that the football pools should be prohibited; the pools companies asked their customers to write to their Member of Parliament, which led to the proposals being withdrawn. The Betting and Lotteries Act 1934 was passed on 27 March 1934 which included restrictions of pool betting. The football pools did not fall under gambling legislation (specifically the Betting and Gaming Act 1960 and its predecessors) because they claimed to be competitions of skill, rather than chance; however, their rules typically stated that all transactions were "binding in honour only". Typically, between one-quarter and half of the entry fees taken would be returned to the players as prizes.

==== Pools War ====
In 1936, revenue from the 28 pools companies had reached almost £30 million per year, and the pools accounted for four million out of six million postal packets sent weekly in the UK. The English Football League was opposed to the betting and decided to withhold publication of their fixture lists in an attempt to thwart the pools companies' ability to print their coupons: games involving long journeys were announced on Thursday evening and others on Friday evening. The pools companies retaliated by printing coupons with just the home sides, then managed to obtain unofficial leaks of the fixtures and gave customers longer to get their coupons in. The "Pools War" ended on 9 March 1936 after two weekends where the fixture lists were not published early. A further attempt to ban the pools was proposed in Parliament at a similar time by R.J. Russell but the bill was defeated on 3 April 1936 by 287 votes to 24.

Barnard continued to run his competition until 1938, when he sold to Cope's Pools of London. Other pools companies included Brittens (founded 1946 in Leicester), Empire (based in Blackpool) and Sherman's Pools of Cardiff, which was absorbed by Littlewoods in 1961.

Dundee United set up a pools competition in 1956 to help fund ground improvements at Tannadice Park. Taypools, as their operation is known, became the model for dozens of other club-run pools and lotteries designed to help boost payrolls or build new stands.

==== War years ====
During World War II, the Post Office refused to deliver the large number of coupons as they were not considered essential, so a Unity Pool organisation was created for the seven largest pools companies to produce joint coupons.

==== Treble Chance ====
The Treble Chance game was inaugurated in 1946. Players were given a list of football matches set to take place over the coming week and attempted to pick a line of eight of them, whose results would be worth the most points by the scoring scheme; traditionally by crossing specific boxes on a printed coupon. A proportion of the players' combined entry fees was distributed as prizes among those whose entries achieved the highest scores. Prior to this the Penny Points and Penny Results were the most popular games. The Treble Chance offered a potential large jackpot at a time when no other form of gambling in the United Kingdom did. Some pools offered additional ways to win, based on scores of football matches at half-time, or football matches in which a particular number of goals were scored.

By 1947, pools revenue had increased to £70 million a year, with over 90% being spent with Littlewoods, Vernon's, Sherman's and Cope's. It accounted for almost 15 million postal packets each week through the post office. By the 1950s, 100,000 people were working in the industry.

==== Agreement with the Football League ====
In July 1959, the High Court of Justice ruled that the Football League owned the copyright to their fixture lists and this led to a 10-year agreement between the pools companies and the English and Scottish Football Leagues, whereby the pools companies would pay the leagues 0.5% of the stakes received (or a minimum of £245,000 per year).

During the 1972-73 season, the deal between the Football League and the pools companies was extended for 13 years worth £23 million.

==== Off-season ====
With professional football not being played in the United Kingdom during the summer, Zetters introduced Australian pools, based on games played in Australia.

=== Mechanics ===
==== Entries ====
Entries were traditionally made by post, or via agents or collectors who received a percentage (usually 12.5%) of the money as a fee. Main collectors, who appointed the agents, delivered the forms and payments to a regional office, which were then dispatched to the companies' central offices. Legally the football pools collectors were agents of the entrants, not the pools company. Business for pools collectors was sustained by periodic canvassing, where company agents knocked on doors in an area of a town or housing estate. Many large factories had at least one employee, who as a sideline, collected coupons from fellow workers.

However, many players were unaware that British law left them at the mercy of unscrupulous collectors who took their money but did not submit the coupons. This was because the Gaming Act 1845 made all forms of gambling a "debt of honour" which meant that any dispute about winnings was exempt from legal redress in a court of law. In 1995, a syndicate lost £2.3million when their collector stole their money and did not hand in their coupon. The group wanted to sue the Pools company but it made it clear it did not employ collectors, they were the punters' agents. The "debt of honour" exemption to taking legal action over unpaid winnings was eventually repealed in the Gambling Act 2005.

A variety of football pools games are now played on the Internet. These include the classic pools game that traditionally includes a large number of fixtures, spanning the weekend. This is the same as the old Treble Chance which has been renamed and rebranded under new ownership. New pools game variants include Jackpot 12, Premier 10 and Soccer 6; these are all games in which the player must correctly predict home win, draw or away win for 12, 10 and six (mainly Premier League) football matches.

==== Scoring ====
Scoring schemes have varied over the years. The current Classic Pools game, based on the old Treble Chance game, uses a scoring scheme which awards three points to score draws (matches where both team scored the same, strictly positive, number of goals), two points to no-score draws (matches where neither team scored a goal) and one point to both home wins (matches where the home team scored more goals than the away team) and away wins (matches where the away team scored more goals than the home team). The most famous historical scoring scheme differentiated between home wins and away wins, awarding one-and-a-half points for games resulting in away wins. A scoring scheme used for only one year, split score draws into two categories, awarding three points only for matches ending 1–1 and two and a half points for higher-scoring score draws.

The total score of each line would be calculated, up to a maximum of 24 points. The highest scoring line achieved by any player in that particular week's competition would be declared to be worth the top dividend, with a large proportion of the prize pool awarded to the players responsible for submitting the highest-scoring lines. Large football pools would award second and subsequent dividends, splitting smaller proportions of the prize pool among players who had submitted lines scoring nearly as many points; at its peak, the Littlewoods Treble Chance game would offer up to six dividends. During the northern hemisphere summer, when football leagues were not in operation in the United Kingdom, competitions were based on the results of football matches taking place in Australia.

As well as this scoring system, the current Classic Pools game has an available top prize of £3 million. In order to secure this £3 million prize, or a share of it, the punter must successfully guess the nine score draws (draws of 1–1 or higher) when these are the only score draws on the coupon.

The other pools games currently provided by The Football Pools are based on entrants predicting the outcome; of results, scores and events in a variety of matches; rather than the awarding of points. Therefore, with the exception of the Premier 10 game (which pays out a smaller dividend for 9/10 correct as well as 10/10 correct), the other games can only be won if all predictions are correct – if they are not all correct then the prize money is rolled over.

==== Pools Panel ====
Matches which were postponed would often have their results adjudicated, for the sake of the football pools results, by a board known as the Pools Panel which had been formed in January 1963 when many football matches were postponed due to the Big Freeze of 1963, a particularly cold winter. Initially, it had five members: ex-footballers Ted Drake, Tom Finney, Tommy Lawton and George Young and ex-referee Arthur Edward Ellis. They predicted 7 draws, 8 away victories and 23 home victories on 23 January 1963 and their predictions were broadcast on television.

The members changed regularly and by 1969, when Raich Carter joined, the other members were Neil Franklin, George Swindin, Arthur Ellis, Stan Mortensen and Ian McColl, under the chairmanship of Sir Ronald Howe. They met in London's Connaught Rooms. It was rumoured that their remuneration was considerably in excess of the national wage of the time.

By 1994, the panel members were Ellis, Gordon Banks, Roger Hunt, Tony Green and Maurice Peston, and the panel was meeting at the London Hilton on Park Lane. Other former members include Gerald Nabarro and Ronnie Simpson.

The panel meets in private session each Saturday from November to April. Its decisions are released once all ongoing matches have entered half time, but before any final results are known. By 2016, there were only three members: Banks, Green and Hunt.

After the death of Banks in February 2019 and Hunt's retirement from the panel, they were replaced by Ian Callaghan and David Sadler, with Green continuing as a member of the three-man panel.

==== Results ====
Until recently, pools results were published in most national newspapers a day or two after the Saturday on which the matches were played. Grids marking the points totals per game were sometimes published, against which a pools coupon could be aligned to read off the scores.

The BBC television programme Grandstand used to broadcast the winning match numbers and any Pools Panel verdicts as part of its Final Score segment in the late afternoon. Pools news was also given out on the BBC radio programme Sports Report until May 2007.

With scores being read out on radio and television it was also common to relay the message "claims by telegram" for days when around eight score-draws occurred (and thus few players expected to achieve maximum points), through "claims by registered mail only" for days when rather more winners were expected, to "no claims" when there were likely to be so many claimants that the mail would have been overwhelmed.

With the arrival of internet-based pools games, the need for players to score their own coupons was removed. Automatic scoring and payout is now standard on all internet-based pools games.

==== Winning ====
Typically, a fraction of a penny would be charged for each line entered, though players often had the option to play each line at a higher stake and so receive a higher share of the pool should their line prove a winner. Accordingly, players would usually submit many different lines in a single entry. Popular ways to do this were "full perm" entries, where 10 (or 11, or more) matches were selected and every possible combination of eight matches selected from the total was entered as a single line. As there are C(10,8) = 45 ways to select eight matches from 10, the cost of such an entry was 45 times the cost of entering a single line. Note that the term "perm" was used despite the relevant mathematical operation being combination rather than permutation, as the order in which the eight matches were selected was irrelevant. The pools companies, many daily newspapers and the sporting press also issued "plans", which were subsets of full perms: these enabled the punter to cover more matches for the same stake, with the proviso that even if eight draws were in the selections, they might not all be in a single line of the plan (but well designed plans could give a guarantee, such as 'if the plan hits eight draws it must win at least a third dividend').

The largest prizes would be awarded when only one line was entered scoring the maximum number of points; typically this would occur when only eight or nine matches ended in score draws, so only one player would have the line scoring the maximum. The odds for selecting 8 draws from 55 matches (if there are only 8 draws) for an all correct line is 1,217,566 to 1 against. These biggest jackpot prizes could be several hundred thousand pounds, sometimes more than a million. Prizes depended on the number of players and the cost per line, which varied between pools companies and increased over the years. One large winner, Viv Nicholson, gained notoriety by declaring she was going to "spend, spend, spend" after winning £152,319 in 1961. The story of her subsequent extravagance and eventual bankruptcy was eventually made into a musical named after her assertion.

At the other extreme, payouts of less than a pound were quite common, as lower dividends when many entries won. Most players could expect to receive at least one low payout if they played for long enough. The odds of winning were around 80 to 1.

In its current form, the Classic Pools game has a top prize of £3 million, separate to the pool prize that is given to the highest point scorer(s). In order to secure this £3 million prize, or a share of it, the punter must successfully guess the nine score draws (draws of 1–1 or higher) when these are the only score draws on the coupon.

With the arrival of the latest online pools games such as Premier 10 and Super 6, the overall pool size is less than the Classic Pools game, but the odds of winning a major prize are increased because fewer predictions are required to complete a coupon and, also, fewer individuals play each coupon.

=== Historic wins ===
In 1972, two people won approximately £1.5 million each on the state run Italian pools. In September 1975, Miron Vieira de Sousa, from the city of Ivolândia in Brazil, won a prize of 22 million Brazilian cruzeiros ($2.5 million), considered at the time "the biggest prize in Loteca and in the world, in prediction contests". In 1981, Tadeu Resende of Volta Redonda won $3,003,532 on the Brazilian football pools, Loteria Esportiva, the world's biggest gambling win at the time. In December 1993, the Italian pools saw their highest jackpot ever recorded with 34 billion lire (£14 million). Some notable UK football pools winners:

Year	Winner	Amount	Notes
1957	Nellie McGrail, Stockport	£205,235	
1961	Keith Nicholson, Castleford	£152,319	husband of Viv Nicholson
1972	Cyril Grimes, Liss, Hampshire	£512,683	first win over £500,000
1979	Irene Powell, Port Talbot	£882,000	first win over £750,000
1985	Patricia Samways, Dorchester; Kevin Adams and 7 friends, Sunderland; George Pinnock, Colchester	£1,600,791	first time three people had won over half a million pounds each
1986	Syndicate of hospital workers from Roundway Hospital near Devizes	£1,017,890	first million-pound win
1987	Barry Dinsdale, Kingston upon Hull	£1,910,972	
1991	Rodi Woodcock	£2,072,220	first double-millionaire
1993	Judy Smith, Isle of Portland	£2,077,683.60	highest UK win at that time
1994	Syndicate from the Yew Tree Inn pub in Worsley, Greater Manchester	£2,924,622	the inaugural weekend of the National Lottery
2010	14 players shared £3 million and one Zetters player scooped £1 million		
2010	Michael Elliott, Brechin	£3,001,511	the highest-ever jackpot, won by betting on eight 2–2 draws across Spain, Scotland and England
2011	four winners won £3 million split four ways, each receiving £750,000		

=== Other games ===
Other games offered by football pools companies take the form of "8 homes", "4 draws", "5 aways" or the like, where lines consisting of a smaller number of matches are selected and a line is deemed to have won if all the selected matches result in home wins, away wins or draws (irrelevant of the size of the draw) respectively. The cost per line is generally higher; because these attract far fewer players, prizes are generally lower. Some football pools companies additionally organised lotteries, betting on lottery results or spot the ball competitions at various points.

In predicting "Homes and Aways", players typically mark more than, for example, eight homes (they might mark 13) and thus their stake increases by the mathematics of combinations. Each line is called a "perm" ("permutation") even though it is actually a mathematical combination not a permutation. It is also possible to reduce the number of perms by taking the most likely and marking them as "bankers" i.e. that they appear on every combination.

=== Tax ===
Companies organising football pools were heavily taxed; in 1991, the levy was reduced from 40% of turnover to 37½% of turnover. Additionally, from 1975 on, 2½% of the entry fees went to form the Football Trust which distributed money to football throughout the UK, in particular to help clubs redevelop their stadiums in line with the recommendations made by the Taylor Report. The business was a reliable source of cash for the pools companies. Each week the money staked was received by the pools company, they deducted their costs, paid the tax, then deducted their profit. What was left was then the prize money available to the winners.

=== Charitable giving ===
The Football Pools have donated over £1.1 billion to sporting-related causes. During the 2009/10 football season a further £6 million was donated to football initiatives including the following

- The Every Player Counts scheme – to grow disability football provision across 44 Football League clubs in England and Wales and increase the opportunities for people with varying disabilities to access sports through their local Football Clubs
- The Premier League Health scheme – to help tackle a range of men’s health issues including testicular cancer, depression and alcoholism
- The Fit for Football, Fit for Life scheme – to help tackle serious health issues for young people across 30 Scottish Football League clubs

=== Decline ===
Competition from the National Lottery led to a rapid fall-off in players, from a peak of 10 million in 1994 to 700,000 in 2007. Vernons closed its pools operation in February 1998, and ran a lucky-dip game called Easy Play with the National Lottery during the 1998–99 football season. It resumed its traditional business afterwards.

In 2000, Littlewoods Pools was sold for £161 million. The company became part of Littlewoods Gaming, a division of Sportech. Sportech bought Zetters in 2002 and Vernons (which had previously been acquired by betting company Ladbrokes in 1989) in 2007, and announced plans to rebrand the competition as The New Football Pools, launching online at footballpools.com during summer 2008. The competition became known as The Football Pools and provided classic football pools games alongside other pools variants, with coupons containing a smaller number of football matches. Sportech sold the business to private equity firm OpCapita in 2017.

The Littlewoods Football Pools Collection, which records the history of the pools, is held by the National Football Museum.

== In other countries ==
Outside the United Kingdom, similar betting games are frequently known as toto competitions; the name derives from totalisator machines which are used to process the parimutuel betting involved. While the principle of requiring entrants to predict the results of football matches in advance remains the same, the format is similar to the British Jackpot 12, Premier 10 and Soccer 6.

Typically, a list of 13 matches for the coming week will be given. Pools entrants select the result of each one, whether it will be a home win, an away win or neither of these, typically by marking each match with either a 1, a 2 or an N (sometimes X or 0). It is possible to enter two or three results for one or more matches, in which case the entry is treated as a number of separate entries for all possible combinations given; marking two possible results for each of five matches and all three possible results for each of four matches will result in submitting 2 × 2 × 2 × 2 × 2 × 3 × 3 × 3 × 3 = 32 × 81 = 2592 different entries. All entries submitting 13 correct predictions will be declared to have won the top prize; sometimes, prizes for fewer correct predictions are also awarded.

In 1946, Italy introduced a state-run pool for citizens to bet on football, called the Totocalcio. It was the only form of legalized football betting in the country until the late 1990s. For fans to win, they needed to correctly pick the outcome of 12 games. A thirteenth game was added in 1951, and a fourteenth (but still called Thirteen) in 2003. Players can win with 9 or more correct predictions. Outside the football season, it is renamed Totosport to include predictions for other sporting events such as Formula 1 and cycling. The bets help finance the Italian National Olympic Committee for which it was awarded their Golden Star for sporting merit in 1997.

The Intertoto Cup football competition was inaugurated by the football pools companies of central Europe to provide matches for their toto coupons during the summer months.

In Brazil, Loteria Esportiva was introduced in 1970 by Caixa Econômica Federal. It was necessary to match the results of thirteen games. The competition went nationwide in 1972. Between 1972 and 1980, there were 17 million weekly bets. In December 1987, the competition increased to cover 16 matches but returned back to 13 in 1989 and was renamed Loteca. It is currently based on 14 matches with the odds of predicting correctly being 1 chance in 2,391,485.

In Australia, the Soccer Pools game, which ran until 2018, operated under a similar premise to traditional pools, but was instead played in a Lotto-style format. The numbers of the seven matches ranked "highest" in a list of 38 (with void games replaced by reserves if necessary) became the six winning and one supplementary (bonus) number respectively. Tie-breakers allowed all 38 games to be ranked in order, for instance preferencing higher-scoring draws (eg. 2-2 would rank higher than 1-1) with the final tie-breaker being match number itself.

== In popular culture ==
The pools feature prominently in the British films Easy Money (1948) and Home and Away (1956) starring Jack Warner, the Italian films Audace colpo dei soliti ignoti (1959) and Al bar dello sport (1983), and the Spanish films La quiniela (1960) and Jenaro, el de los 14 (1974). In "The Football Pools," the final episode of the fifth television series of Hancock's Half Hour (1959), Tony Hancock has picked seven draws and nervously attends a late-kickoff match with the eighth draw and top dividend on the line. Viv Nicholson's life after her win of more than £152,000 in 1961 was made into the musical "Spend Spend Spend". Charles Causley's poem Timothy Winters begins "Timothy Winters comes to school, With eyes as wide as a football pool". This was used prominently by Christopher Eccleston's character in Hearts and Minds, a 1995 television series. In 2022 historical comedy drama film Mrs Harris Goes to Paris, set in 1957, the title character becomes obsessed with a Christian Dior dress owned by one of her clients and after a big win on the football pools she sets out to save up the money to go to Paris and buy her own dress.

== See also ==
- Gambling in the United Kingdom
- Footy tipping
- Sports betting
- Horace Batchelor, radio promoter of the "Famous Infra-Draw Method"
- Covering code for the mathematics behind continental European pools
