= Viv Nicholson =

British football pools winner

- Born: Vivian Asprey; 3 April 1936; Castleford, Yorkshire, England
- Died: 11 April 2015 (aged 79); Wakefield, Yorkshire, England
- Spouse(s): Matthew Johnson (1952–1954); Keith Howard Nicholson (1954–1965); Brian Stewart Wright (1969–1971); Peter Graham Ellison (1972); Gary Shaw (1985–1990)
- Children: 4

Vivian "Viv" Nicholson (née Asprey; 3 April 1936 – 11 April 2015) was an English woman who became famous when she told the media that she would "spend, spend, spend" after her husband Keith won £152,319 (equivalent to £3,000,000 in 2025) on the football pools in 1961. Nicholson became the subject of tabloid news stories for many years because of the couple's subsequent rapid spending of their fortune and her later chaotic life.

== Early life ==
Nicholson was born Vivian Asprey on 3 April 1936 in Castleford near Wakefield. Her father was a coal miner, but suffered from epilepsy, and was often unable to work. Her mother was asthmatic. As the oldest child, Asprey was expected to mind her younger brothers and sisters and scavenge for coal. Growing up in extreme poverty, she was not allowed to take up a scholarship that she had won to an art school. Having left school at age 14, she took work at the local liquorice factory making Pontefract cakes.

She became pregnant at age 16 and married Matthew Johnson, but left him to marry her neighbour, Keith Nicholson, two years later. By 1961, she had four children.

== Wealth ==
Keith Nicholson won the football pools on 23 September 1961. His and his wife's lavish spending sprees (including purchases of expensive sportscars, fur coats, clothing, home appliances, jewellery and holiday trips) over the next few years quickly depleted their fortune. By her own admission, Viv faced difficulty in coping with the psychological effects of the money that Keith had won. Having no concept of how to manage and save money, she admitted that her spending was akin to a narcotics addiction. She came to feel distanced from the people among whom she had lived, who in turn could no longer relate to her, and she developed an ever greater longing for a much more affluent lifestyle.

After Keith died after crashing his Jaguar on 30 October 1965, Viv's fortune rapidly dwindled to nothing; banks and tax creditors deemed her bankrupt and declared that all the money, and everything that she had acquired with it, belonged not to her but to Keith's estate.

In 1968, Nicholson won a three-year legal battle to gain £34,000 from her husband's estate, but rapidly lost it all by more uncontrolled spending, as well as by taxes, legal fees, unpaid bills and bad investments.

== Difficulties ==
In 1970, Nicholson moved to Malta, but the following year, after she was arrested for assaulting a policeman, the Maltese authorities deported her, and she returned to Britain. She remarried, but her new husband Brian Wright was later also killed in a car crash. She entered a mental home to escape from her next husband Graham Ellison, who abused her during the four days in which they lived together; the marriage lasted 13 weeks. Her fifth and final husband, Gary Shaw, died of a drug overdose.

Nicholson's alcoholism became serious during her wealthy years but continued for many years after she had lost all of her money. She eventually achieved sobriety.

She made many unsuccessful attempts to regain both her public profile and her lost wealth, such as recording a song (titled "Spend Spend Spend", written by her brother) and appearing in a strip club singing "Big Spender." After opening a short-lived boutique, she ended up penniless, and by 1976 claimed that she could not even afford to bury her fourth husband (they had broken up three years earlier) when he died.

In 1978, Nicholson co-wrote an autobiography with Stephen Smith titled Spend, Spend, Spend that was dramatised for the BBC's Play for Today series by Jack Rosenthal. Spend, Spend, Spend (1977) was directed by John Goldschmidt (who won a BAFTA award for the filmed play) and stars Susan Littler and John Duttine.

Nicholson died at Pinderfields Hospital, Wakefield at age 79 on 11 April 2015 after having a stroke and suffering from dementia.

== In culture ==
A photograph of Nicholson was used on the sleeve of the Smiths' single "Heaven Knows I'm Miserable Now." Morrissey had previously borrowed a line from Nicholson's autobiography for the song "Still Ill" ("Under the iron bridge we kissed, and although I ended up with sore lips..."). Another picture of Nicholson taken at Wheldale Colliery, Castleford, West Yorkshire was used on the German release of "Barbarism Begins at Home" and on the programme for the Meat Is Murder tour. A photo of Nicholson painting at an easel was used for the cover of a 1988 re-release of "The Headmaster Ritual." However, as she had become a Jehovah's Witness in 1979, Nicholson objected to the use of her image for the single's cover because of an expletive in the song's lyrics ("Spineless bastards all...").

In her autobiography, guitarist Viv Albertine of The Slits says that their song "Spend, Spend, Spend" was inspired by Viv Nicholson.

A successful musical based on Nicholson's life called Spend Spend Spend debuted in 1998 and subsequently ran in the West End.
