= 2010 Sark general election =

← 2008	8 December 2010	2012 →

14 (of the 30) seats in the Chief Pleas
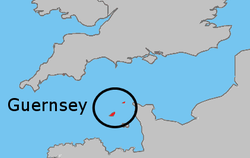
- The location of the Bailiwick of Guernsey which includes Sark

General elections were held in Sark on 8 December 2010, the second elections held on the island under the 2008 Constitution. The elections were for 14 of the seats that had been elected in the 2008 elections, for a four-year term.

Twenty-one candidates contested the elections.

== Background ==
On 16 January and 21 February 2008, the Chief Pleas approved a law which introduces a 30-member chamber, with 28 elected members and two unelected members. On 9 April 2008 the Privy Council approved the Sark law reforms. The first election held in Sark under the 2008 Constitution took place on 10 December 2008, and the new chamber convened for the first time on 21 January 2009.

== Electoral system ==
The first election held in Sark under the 2008 Constitution took place on 10 December 2008. In total, 28 Conseillers were to be elected via plurality block voting from 57 candidates, with the latter figure representing about 12% of the electorate in the island. A recount was ordered as several of the candidates for the last seat were separated by only a few votes.

== Results ==
The elections reflected the division throughout the island between those who support the traditional system and those who support further reforms. The second elections did not attract similar worldwide media coverage as the first, described as 'business as usual' by local media.

Position	Candidate	Votes	Elected
1	David Thomas Cocksedge	293	Yes
2	Helen Mildred Plummer	281	Yes
3	David Woods Melling	267	Yes
4	Christopher Robert Nightingale	258	Yes
5	Andrew Phillip Foley Bache	242	Yes
6	Edric Baker	212	Yes
7	Christopher Howard Bateson	211	Yes
8	Stefan Bernd Gomoll	211	Yes
9	Diane Baker	201	Yes
10	Anthony Granville Ventress	192	Yes
11	Andrew James Cook	189	Yes
12	Michelle Andrée Perrée	189	Yes
13	Janet Mary Guy	169	Yes
14	John Edward Hunt	167	Yes
15	Peter John Cole	158	No
16	Fiona Ann Bird	152	No
17	Tony Eric le Lievre	147	No
18	John Trevor Greer Donnelly	133	No
19	Stephen Treweek Taylor	116	No
20	Paul David Mitchell Burgess	107	No
21	Peter Blayney Stisted	104	No
