= 2014 Sark general election =

General elections were due to be held in Sark on 10 December 2014. However, only 16 candidates nominated for the 16 seats in the Chief Pleas, meaning that all were elected unopposed, without a public vote being required.

On 10 December a draw was carried out to decide which two candidates would serve two-year terms, and which fourteen would serve four-year terms.

== Conduct ==
The Sark Government appointed Howard Knight to serve as an international observer of the elections. Howard commented that the lack of competition raised questions "about the democratic credentials" of the elections.

== Results ==
Candidate	Term length	Notes
Diane Baker	4	Re-elected
Edric Baker	4	Re-elected
Paul Burgess	4	Re-elected
Peter Byrne	4	Re-elected
Elsie Courtney	4	Elected
Colin Golds	4	Elected
Charles Noel Donald Maitland	4	Elected
Nicolas Moloney	4	Elected
Christopher Robert Nightingale	2	Re-elected
Elizabeth Norwich	4	Elected
Roger Norwich	4	Elected
Helen Mildred Plummer	4	Re-elected
William Raymond	4	Elected
Arthur Rolfe	4	Elected
Stephen Taylor	4	Elected
Anthony Granville Ventress	2	Re-elected
Chief Pleas, ITV
