= Chief Pleas (disambiguation) =

Chief Pleas or Court of Chief Pleas may refer to:

- Chief Pleas (Sark), legislative assembly of Sark, Channel Islands
- Court of Chief Pleas (Guernsey), ancient court which meets annually in Guernsey, Channel Islands
- Court of Chief Place, former court in Ireland, occasionally called "Court of Chief Pleas"

== See also ==
- Exchequer of Pleas or Court of Exchequer
- Court of Common Pleas, type of court in various common-law jurisdictions
