= 2016 Sark general election =

General elections were due to be held in Sark on 14 December 2016. However, only 12 candidates were nominated for the 17 seats available in the Chief Pleas, meaning that all were elected unopposed for a four-year term, without a public vote being required.

A by-election was due to take place on 5 April in 2017 to fill the five vacant seats. Only one candidate, Pauline Margaret Mallinson, stood as a candidate in the by-election. She was declared duly elected unopposed, with a term to end in January 2021, and the remaining four seats were left vacant.

== Results ==
Candidate	Term length	Notes
Alan Leslie George Blythe	4	Re-elected
Robert William Cottle	4	Re-elected
Antony Dunks	4	Re-elected
Hazel D Fry	4	Re-elected
Reginald John Guille	4	Elected
Peter S Latrobe-Bateman	4	Elected
Sebastien Bernard Joel Moerman	4	Elected
Christopher Robert Nightingale	4	Re-elected
Cormac Joseph Scott	4	Elected
Anthony Granville Ventress	4	Re-elected
Paul Joseph Williams	4	Re-elected
Sandra Williams	4	Re-elected
Chief Pleas
