= The Village, Sark =

Main settlement of Sark

The Village is the main settlement and administrative centre of Sark, located near the middle of the island. It is the centre of daily life in Sark and contains most of the island’s shops, cafés, guesthouses, hotels, and public buildings. The Village is also home to important community facilities such as the Island Hall and serves as a focal point for local events, meetings, and government activity connected with the Chief Pleas

One of the Village’s most distinctive features is its peaceful atmosphere, as private cars are generally banned on Sark. Most transport is by bicycle, tractor, horse-drawn carriage, or on foot, giving the area a traditional character that attracts many visitors. The main street, known as the Avenue, links different parts of the settlement and provides access to routes leading to places such as the harbour at Maseline and the historic manor of La Seigneurie. Tourism plays an important role in the Village, making it both the social and economic heart of the island.

== History ==
The Village of Sark developed gradually after the island was colonised in 1565 under the rule of Helier de Carteret. As settlers established farms and small communities across Sark, the Village emerged near the centre of the island as a convenient meeting and trading point. Over time, it became the location of shops, inns, and public buildings that supported the island’s growing population.

During the following centuries, the Village developed into the social and administrative centre of Sark. Important institutions connected with the island’s feudal government and later the Chief Pleas became based there, while roads linked it to the harbour and surrounding settlements. Because motor cars were never widely introduced on Sark, the Village retained much of its traditional appearance and quiet character, helping preserve its historic atmosphere into the modern era.

== Governance ==
The Village is the principal settlement and administrative centre of Sark, serving as the focal point for much of the island's civic, commercial, and community life. Although it is the island's main population centre, The Village does not have its own municipal or local government. Instead, it is governed as an integral part of Sark under the island's constitutional and administrative framework.

Governance is exercised through Chief Pleas, Sark's elected legislature, which is responsible for making laws, setting policy, and overseeing public administration for the entire island, including The Village. The settlement is also home to several of Sark's key public institutions, including government offices and the court, making it the administrative heart of the island. Overall responsibility for Sark's government rests with the island's elected representatives, while the constitutional role of the Seigneur continues as part of Sark's historic system of governance.

== Notable people ==
Notable people associated with the Village and wider community of Sark include:

- Sibyl Hathaway — Dame of Sark from 1927 to 1974, famous for leading the island during the German occupation in World War II.
- Michael Beaumont — Seigneur of Sark from 1974 to 2016 and an important figure in the island’s transition from feudal rule to democracy.
- Christopher Beaumont — current Seigneur of Sark and hereditary head of the island.
- Helier de Carteret — founder and first Seigneur of Sark, responsible for settling the island in 1565.
- Marie Collings — 19th-century Dame of Sark and member of the Collings family that later ruled the island.

Most notable figures connected with the Village are also important figures in Sark’s political, feudal, or community history, since the Village has long been the island’s administrative and social centre.
