= 2012 Sark general election =

General elections were held in Sark on 12 December 2012 to elect half of the 28 members of the Chief Pleas. Ten conseillers were re-elected, four candidates were elected for the first time, and two sitting conseillers lost their seats.

== Electoral system ==
The 28 members of the Chief Pleas were elected via plurality block voting for four-year terms in two tranches. The 2012 election was held to replace members who had been elected for a four-year term in 2008.

== Campaign ==
A total of 22 candidates contested the elections, vying for the 14 available seats.

== Conduct ==
The Sark Government appointed Norman Browse to serve as an observer of the elections. Browse reported that the elections were "open and transparent".

== Results ==
Candidate	Votes	%	Notes
Sandra Williams	244	6.60	Re-elected
Hazel Fry	226	6.11	Re-elected
Karen Adams	219	5.93	Elected
Richard James Dewe	215	5.82	Re-elected
Elizabeth Mary Dewe	211	5.71	Re-elected
Michael Mann	206	5.57	Elected
Antony Dunks	203	5.49	Re-elected
Andrew Prevel	189	5.11	Re-elected
Paul Williams	186	5.03	Re-elected
Rosanne Byrne	184	4.98	Re-elected
Margaret Mallinson	175	4.73	Elected
Christine Dorothy Audrain	172	4.65	Re-elected
Charles Noel Donald Maitland	158	4.27	Re-elected
Robert Cottle	155	4.19	Elected
Tony Le Lievre	146	3.95	
Stephen Taylor	144	3.90	Lost seat
Simon Couldridge	129	3.49	
Lorraine Southern	127	3.44	
Gemma Knight	117	3.17	
Natalie Craik	110	2.98	
Paul Burgess	105	2.84	
Simon Higgins	75	2.03	Lost seat
Total	3,696	100	
Valid votes	344	100	
Invalid/blank votes	0	0.0	
Total votes cast	344	100	
Registered voters/turnout	444	77.48	
Source: BBC
