= Prospero's Daughter =

Prospero's Daughter may refer to:

- Miranda, daughter of the magician Prospero in Shakespeare's play The Tempest
- the Prospero's Daughter trilogy of fantasy novels by L. Jagi Lamplighter
- Prospero's Daughter, a novel by Elizabeth Nunez
