= Sark =

Island in the southwestern English Channel

Sark Sèr / Cerq (Sercquiais) Sercq (French)
- Jurisdiction of the Bailiwick of Guernsey
- Flag Coat of arms
- Anthem: "God Save the King" (Note: "God Save the King" is the national anthem by custom, not statute, and there is no authorised version. Typically only the first verse is usually sung, although the second verse is also often sung as well at state and public events. The words King, he, him, his, used at present, are replaced by Queen, she, her when the monarch is female.)
- Location of Sark (circled) in the Bailiwick of Guernsey (red)

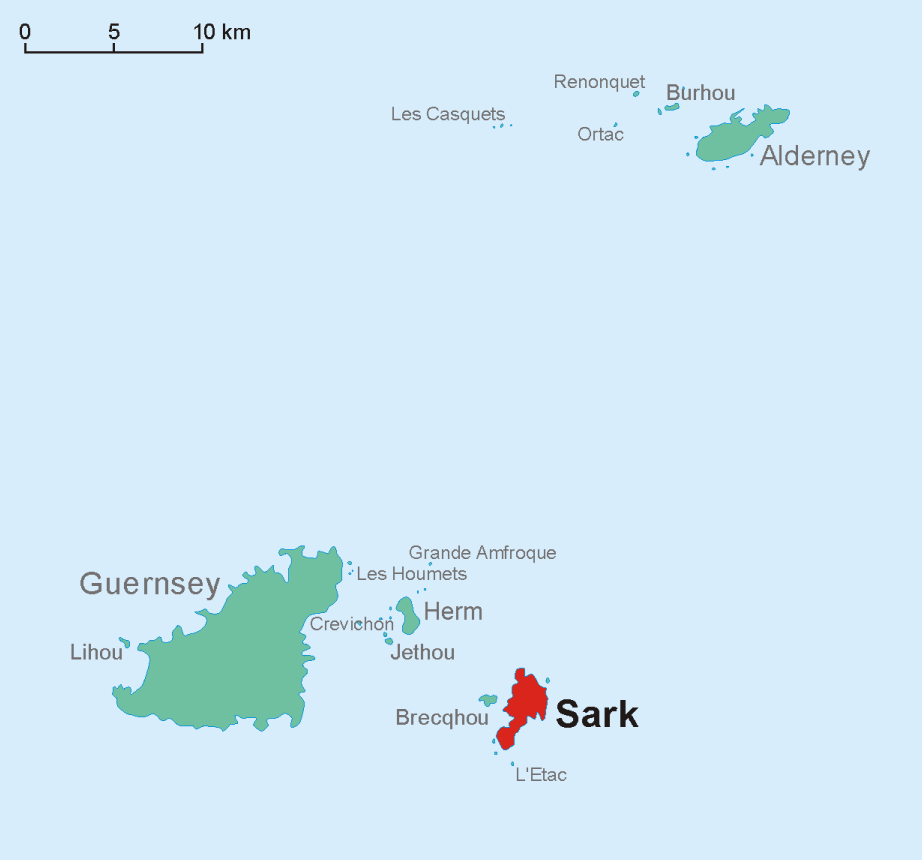
- Map of Sark within the Bailiwick
- Sovereign state responsible for the Bailiwick: United Kingdom
- Crown Dependency: Bailiwick of Guernsey
- Separation from the Duchy of Normandy: 1204
- Fief granted to Hellier de Carteret: 1565
- Feudalism abolished: 9 April 2008
- Traditional capital: La Seigneurie
- Largest settlement: The Village, Sark
- Official languages: English
- Recognised regional languages: Sercquiais
- Government: Self-governing dependency under a parliamentary constitutional monarchy
  - Duke: Charles III
  - Seigneur: Christopher Beaumont
- Legislature: Chief Pleas

Government of the United Kingdom
  - Minister: Baroness Levitt

Area
  - Total: 5.45 km^{2} (2.10 sq mi)

Population
  - 2023 census: 562
  - Density: 103/km^{2} (266.8/sq mi)
- Currency: Guernsey pound (Note: The Guernsey pound is not a separate currency, but a local issue of standard pound sterling.); Pound sterling (£); (GBP)
- Time zone: UTC±00:00 (GMT)
  - Summer (DST): UTC+01:00 (BST)
- Date format: dd/mm/yyyy
- Driving side: Left
- Calling code: +44
- UK postcode: GY10
- ISO 3166 code: GG (CQ reserved)
- Internet TLD: .gg (.cq reserved)

Sark (Sercquiais: Sèr or Cerq, French: Sercq) is an island in the southwestern English Channel, off the coast of Normandy, and part of the archipelago of the Channel Islands. It is part of the Bailiwick of Guernsey, a self-governing British Crown Dependency, with its own set of laws based on Norman law, and its own parliament. It was a royal fiefdom until 2008, when the Constitution of Sark went into effect.

Sark has a population of about 500. Most of Sark’s residents live in The Village, its main settlement and administrative center. Including the nearby island of Brecqhou, it has an area of 2.10 square miles (5.44 km^{2}). Little Sark is a peninsula joined by a natural but high and very narrow isthmus to the rest of Sark Island.

Sark is one of the few places in the world where cars are banned from roads, and only tractors, bicycles, and horse-drawn vehicles are allowed. In 2011, Sark was designated as a Dark Sky Community and the first Dark Sky Island in the world.

== Geography and geology ==
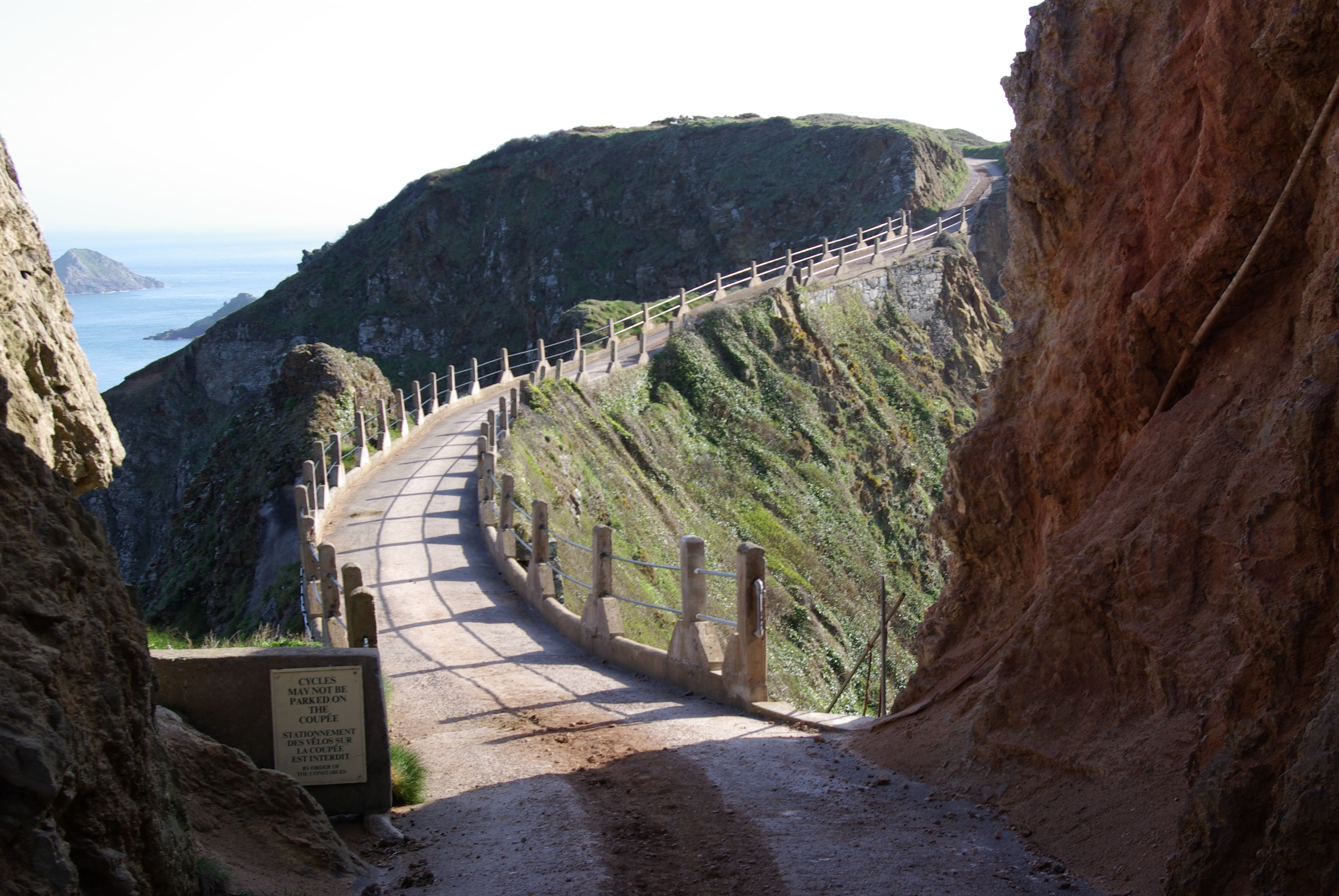
La Coupée

Sark consists of two main parts, Greater Sark, located at about 49°25′N 2°22′W, and Little Sark to the south. They are connected by a narrow isthmus called La Coupée which is 300 feet (91 m) long and has a drop of 330 feet (100 m) on each side. Protective railings were added in 1900; before then, children would crawl across on their hands and knees to avoid being blown over the edge. A narrow concrete road covering the entirety of the isthmus was built in 1945 by German prisoners of war under the direction of the Royal Engineers. Due to its isolation, the inhabitants of Little Sark had their distinct form of Sercquiais, the native Norman dialect of the island.

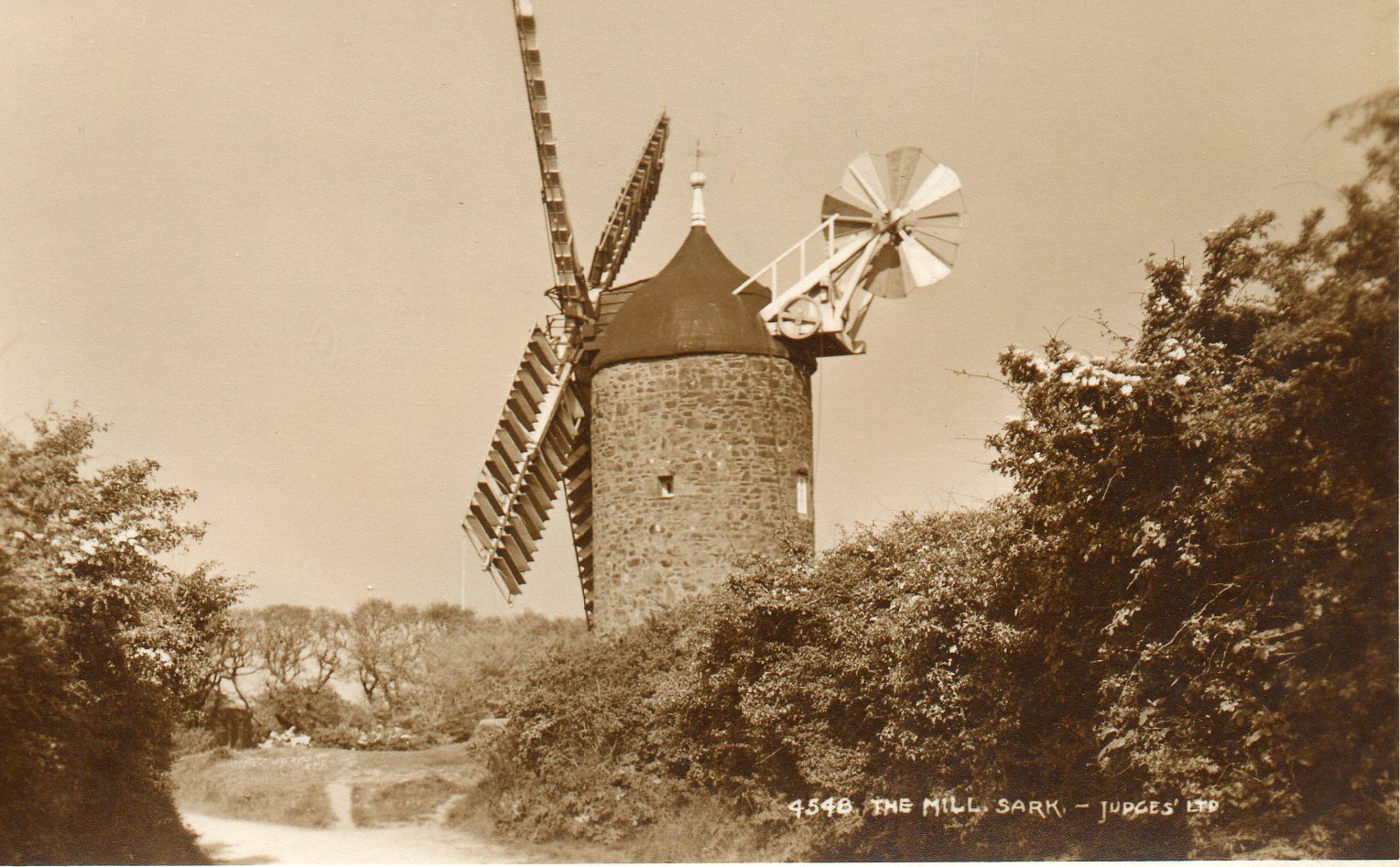
"Le Moulin" windmill, c. 1905

The highest point on Sark is 374 feet (114 m) above sea level. A windmill, dated 1571, is found there, the sails of which were removed during World War II. This high point is named Le Moulin, after the windmill. The location is also the highest point in the Bailiwick of Guernsey. Little Sark had a number of mines accessing a source of galena. At Port Gorey, the ruins of silver mines may be seen. Off the south end of Little Sark are the Venus Pool and the Adonis Pool, both natural swimming pools whose waters are refreshed at high tide.

The whole island is extensively penetrated at sea level by natural cave formations that provide unique habitats for many marine creatures, notably sea anemones, some of which are only safely accessible at low tide.

Sark is made up mainly of amphibolite and granite gneiss rocks, intruded by igneous magma sheets called quartz diorite. Recent (1990–2000) geological studies and rock age-dating by geologists from Oxford Brookes University shows that the gneisses probably formed around 620–600 million years ago during the Late Pre-Cambrian Age Cadomian Orogeny. The quartz diorite sheets were intruded during this Cadomian deformation and metamorphic event.

All the Sark rocks (and those of the nearby Channel Islands of Guernsey and Alderney) formed during geological activity in the continental crust above an ancient subduction zone. This geological setting would have been analogous to the modern-day subduction zone of the Pacific Ocean plate colliding and subducting beneath the North and South American continental plate.

Sark also exercises jurisdiction over the island of Brecqhou, only a few hundred feet west of Greater Sark. It is a private island, but it has recently been opened to some visitors. From 1993 Brecqhou was owned by the brothers David and Frederick Barclay, until David Barclay died in 2021 and Frederick Barclay became sole owner. The brothers contested Sark's control over the island. The candidates endorsed by their various business interests on the island failed to win many seats in the elections held in 2008 and 2010.

== Toponymy ==
=== Old records ===
Sark is probably first mentioned in the Antonine Itinerary (Itinerarium Antonini Augusti, part II: itinerarium maritimum) 3rd – 4th century AD together with the other main Channel Islands as Sarnia, Caesarea, Barsa, Silia and Andium, but it is unclear to which it refers. It has been suggested that Silia referred to Sark. The earliest records to evoke possibly the name of Sark are the Life of Saint Samson and the Life of Saint Magloire, bishops of Dol-de-Bretagne. They spell it Sargia, with the neighbouring island Bissargia, all the other documents are from the 11th to the 12th century and the forms are: Serc, Serch, Sercum, Serco.

=== Etymology ===
Richard Coates has suggested that in the absence of a Proto-Indo-European etymology it may be worthwhile looking for a Proto-Semitic source for the name. He proposes a comparison between the probable root of Sark, *Sarg-, and Proto-Semitic *śrq "redden; rise (as of the sun); east", noting Sark's position as the easternmost island of the Guernsey group. His theory is based on the early medieval Latin records mentioning Sargia, but many Islands more or less close to Sark have a Latin name ending with -gia, such as Angia (Channel Island), Oye-Plage (Pas-de-Calais, Ogia 8th century) and Île-d'Yeu (Vendée, former Augia). Later records all mention Serc- and not *Sark, that seem to result from a later anglicising of the /er/ group (compare French merveille > English marvel; French Clerc / English clerk, clark cf. Clark). The traditional pronunciation of Sark in the native Norman language is sèr [sɛr], with regular fall of final [k] like clerc in French. Finally, no specialist ever identified any Proto-Semitic element in the French coastal toponymy, even on the French mediterranean side. René Lepelley suggests a Scandinavian etymology that would explain the regular and late records of the root Serc- in the documents, according to him, it could be Old Norse serkr "shirt". He compares with the name given to an island or a mountain by Vikings sailing from Norway to Greenland: Hvítserkr cf. Hvitserk, maybe Mount Forel, so Old Saxon *Serki or Old Norse Serkr > Serc could have been a descriptive landmark for Saxon or Scandinavian sailors. In addition Norman toponymy reveals a mixture of (Anglo-)Saxon and Old Norse (Old Danish) place name elements. The Old English form of sark "shirt" (related to Old Norse serkr) is precisely serċ, syrċ > Middle English serk, serke, sark (through the Anglian variant).

Notably, germanic languages in Western Europe and Northern Europe regularly use the term "Serkland" to refer to Muslim lands.

== History ==
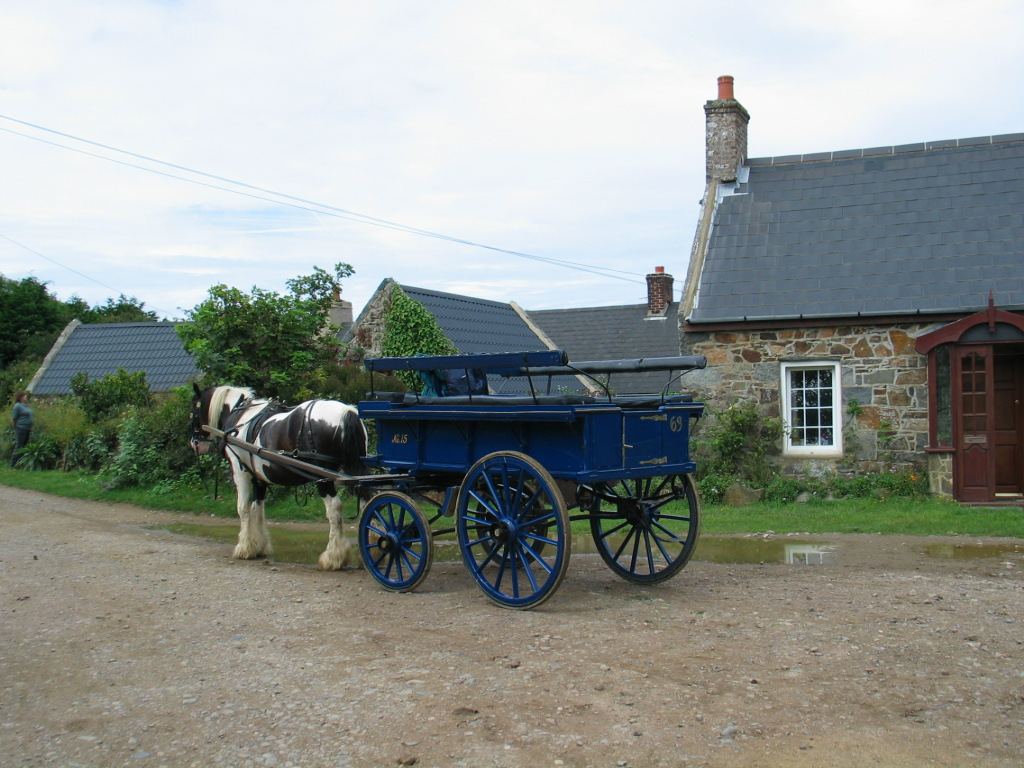
A horse-drawn carriage on Sark

=== Early history ===
In ancient times, Sark was almost certainly occupied by the Unelli, the Gallic tribe of the Cotentin Peninsula. These people were conquered by Julius Caesar of the Roman Republic about 56 BC in the Gallic Wars. About three decades later under Augustus, Gallia Celtica was subdivided into three parts, with this area a part of Gallia Lugdunensis, with its capital in Lugdunum, now Lyon. A later division was named Lugdunensis secunda (Lyonnaise 2nd). A Unelli town, now Coutances, was named Constantia in 298 by the Roman emperor Constantius Chlorus.

Around 430, the bishopric of Coutances (much later under the archbishopric of Rouen), was established in Coutances, having about the same limits as the Lyonnaise 2nd.

In 933, Sark was included in the Duchy of Normandy, based on the traditional boundaries of the Lugdunensis secunda and the archbishopric of Rouen. Following the Norman conquest of England in 1066, the island was united with the Crown of England. In the 13th century, the French pirate Eustace the Monk, having served King John, used Sark as a base of operations.

During the Middle Ages, the island was populated by monastic communities. By the 16th century, however, the island was uninhabited and used by pirates as a refuge and base. In 1565, Helier de Carteret, Seigneur of St. Ouen in Jersey, received letters patent from Queen Elizabeth I granting him Sark as a fief in perpetuity on condition that he kept the island free of pirates and occupied by at least 40 men who were of her English subjects or swore allegiance to the Crown. This he duly did, leasing 40 parcels of land (known as "Tenements") at a low rent to 40 families, mostly from St Ouen, on condition that a house be built and maintained on each parcel and that "the Tenant" provide one man, armed with a musket, for the defence of the island. The 40 tenements survive to this day, albeit with minor boundary changes. (In 2015, the 450th anniversary of this event was commemorated with the construction of a modern henge monument, Sark Henge.) A subsequent attempt by the families to establish a constitution under a bailiff, as in Jersey, was stopped by the Guernsey authorities who resented any attempt to wrest Sark from their bailiwick.

=== Recent history ===
In 1844, desperate for funds to continue the operation of the silver mine on the island, the incumbent Seigneur, Ernest le Pelley, obtained Crown permission to mortgage Sark's fief to local privateer John Allaire. After the company running the mine went bankrupt, le Pelley was unable to keep up the mortgage payments and, in 1849, his son Pierre Carey le Pelley, the new Seigneur, was forced to sell the fief to Marie Collings for a total of £1,383 (£6,000 less the sum borrowed and an accumulated interest of £616 and 13s).

During World War II, the island, along with the other Channel Islands, was occupied by German forces between 1940 and 1945. German military rule on Sark began on 4 July 1940, the day after the Guernsey Kommandant Major Albrecht Lanz and his interpreter and chief of staff Major Maas visited the island to inform the Dame and Seigneur (Sibyl and Robert Hathaway) of the new regime. British Commandos raided the island several times. Operation Basalt, during the night of 3–4 October 1942, captured a prisoner, and Hardtack 7 was a failed British landing in December 1943. Sark was finally liberated on 10 May 1945, a full day after Guernsey.

In late August 1990, an unemployed French nuclear physicist named André Gardes, who believed he was the rightful holder of the Seigneur's title, attempted an invasion of Sark armed with a semi-automatic weapon. The night Gardes arrived, he put up two posters declaring his intention to take over the island the following day at noon. The following day he started a solo foot patrol in front of the manor, in battle-dress, weapon in hand. While Gardes was sitting on a bench waiting for noon to arrive, the island's volunteer connétable approached the Frenchman and complimented him on the quality of his weapon. Gardes changed the gun's magazine to illustrate how it worked, allowing the constable to tackle and arrest him. He was given a seven-day sentence, which he served in Guernsey. Gardes attempted this again the following year, but was recognized in Guernsey, arrested, and handed over to the French government.

==== Transition to new system of government ====
Billionaire brothers David and Frederick Barclay had purchased an island within Sark's territorial waters in 1993 along with the hotels on the island. In the mid-1990s, the brothers petitioned the European Court of Human Rights in Strasbourg, France, challenging Sark's inheritance law, which mandated their island be left to David's oldest son. The brothers wanted to will their estate equally to their four children. In 1999, women in Sark were given equal rights of property inheritance, mainly due to the brothers' influence.

Until 2008, Sark's parliament (Chief Pleas) was a single chamber consisting of 54 members, comprising the Seigneur, the Seneschal, 40 owners of the tenements and 12 elected deputies. A change to the system was advocated largely by the Barclay brothers. Their premise was that a change was necessary to comply with the European Convention on Human Rights, though it was suggested that their objection was more likely at odds with certain property tax requirements and primogeniture laws affecting their holdings. The old system was described as feudal and undemocratic because the tenants were entitled to sit in Chief Pleas as of right.

On 16 January 2008 and 21 February 2008, the Chief Pleas approved a law to reform Chief Pleas as a 30-member chamber, with 28 members elected in island-wide elections, one hereditary member (the Seigneur) and one member (the Seneschal) appointed for life. (Note: The changes were in the Reform (Sark) Law, 2008 and the Real Property (Transfer Tax, Charging and Related Provisions) (Sark) Law, 2007) The Privy Council of the United Kingdom approved the Sark law reforms on 9 April 2008. The first elections under the new law were held in December 2008 and the new chamber first convened in January 2009.

Some Sark residents have complained that the new system is not democratic and have described the powers the new law granted to the Seneschal, an unelected member whose term the new law extended to the duration of his natural life, as imperial or dictatorial. The Court of Appeal had ruled his powers to be in breach of the European Convention on Human Rights and his powers were subject to further legal challenges on these grounds.

In 2012, the BBC Today programme reported on local disquiet about the influence on the island of the Barclay brothers. The New Yorker magazine further illustrated the ongoing and escalating tensions between the Barclays and some of the longer-term residents. In 2017, Private Eye also reported on the situation, following the Barclays' decision to close their vineyard and a number of hotels and shops they own on Sark.

==== Dark Sky Community status ====
In January 2011, the International Dark-Sky Association designated Sark as Europe's first Dark Sky Community and the first Dark Sky Island in the world. This designation recognises that Sark is sufficiently clear of light pollution to allow naked-eye astronomy. Although Sark was aided in its achievement by its location, its historic ban on cars and the fact that there is no public lighting, it was also necessary for local residents to make adjustments, such as re-siting lights, to cut the light pollution.

The designation was made in January 2011, following an audit by the IDA in 2010. The award is significant in that Sark is the first island community to have achieved this; other Dark-Sky Places have, up to now, been mainly uninhabited areas, and IDA chairman Martin Morgan-Taylor commended Sark residents for their effort. After the designation was granted, Sark Astronomy Society worked to secure funds for an astronomical observatory on the island. In October 2015 Sark's observatory was officially opened by Marek Kukula, public astronomer from the Royal Observatory Greenwich.

== Politics ==
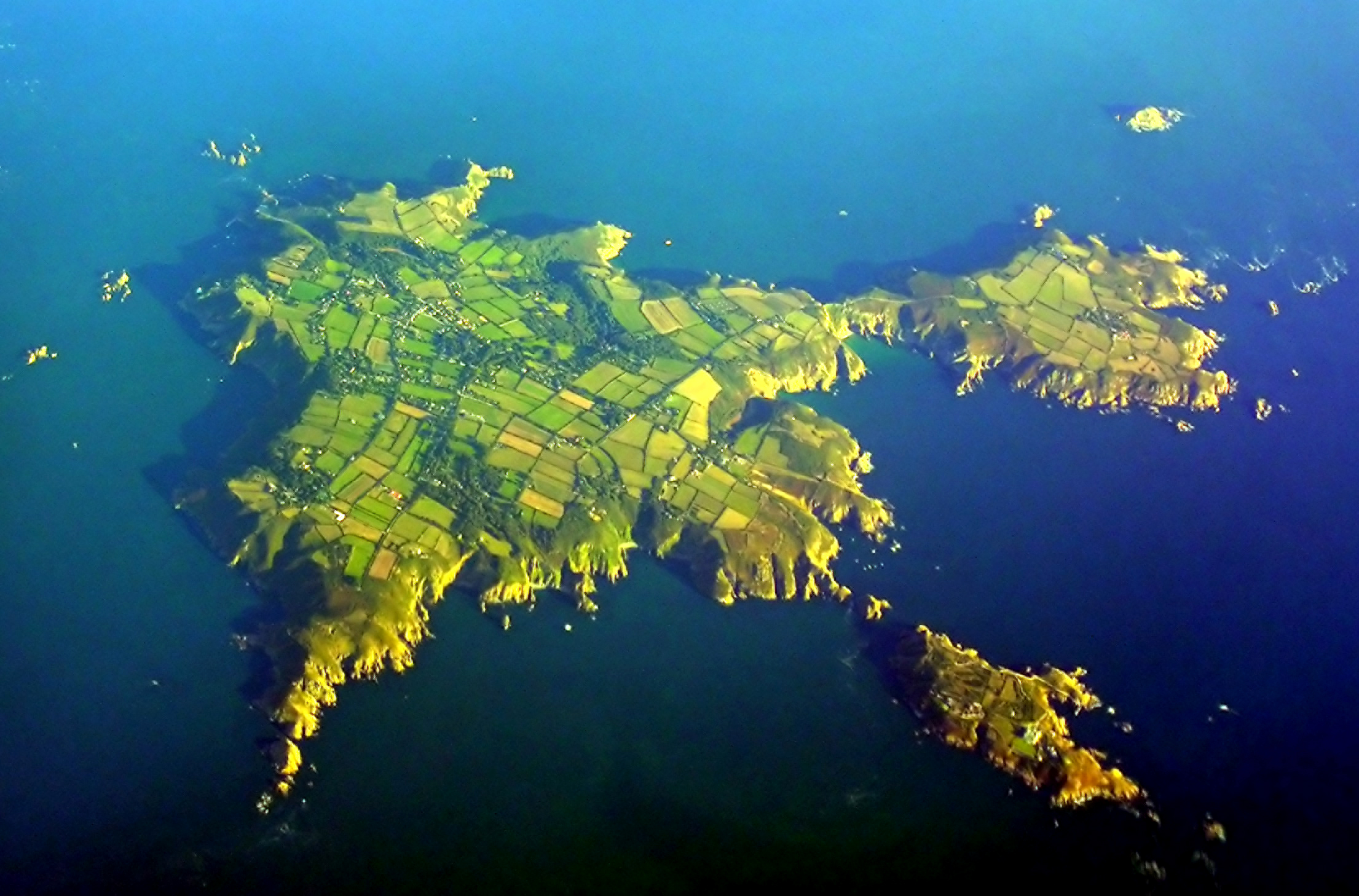
September 2005 aerial view of Sark. North is to the lower left, Little Sark toward the upper right and Brecqhou at bottom right.

Until the second half of the 2000s, Sark was considered the last feudal state in Europe. Together with the other Channel Islands, it is the last remnant of the former Duchy of Normandy still belonging to the Crown. Sark belongs to the Crown in its own right and has an independent relationship with the Crown through the Lieutenant Governor in Guernsey. Formally, the Seigneur holds it as a fief from the Crown, reenfeoffing the landowners on the island with their respective parcels. The political consequences of this construction were abolished in recent years, particularly in the reform of the legislative body, Chief Pleas, which took place in 2008.

Although part of the Bailiwick of Guernsey, Sark is fiscally separate from the rest of the Bailiwick. Together with the islands of Alderney and Guernsey, Sark from time to time approves Bailiwick of Guernsey legislation, which, subject to the approval of all three legislatures, applies in the entire Bailiwick. Legislation cannot be made which applies on Sark without the approval of the Chief Pleas, although recently Chief Pleas has been delegating a number of ordinance-making powers to the States of Guernsey. Such powers are, however, in each case subject to dis-application, or repeal, by the Chief Pleas. By long standing custom, Sark's criminal law has been made by the States of Guernsey, and this custom was put on a statutory basis in Section 4 of the Reform (Sark) Law, 2008, by which Sark delegates criminal law making power to the States of Guernsey.

Sark has its own United Nations Standard Country or Area Code for Statistical Use (680). That code is used for statistical processing purposes by the Statistics Division of the United Nations Secretariat.

The ISO 3166-1 code element CQ has been exceptionally reserved to refer to Sark. An "exceptionally reserved" code element does not represent a country name in ISO 3166-1, but is reserved for a particular use at the special request of a national ISO member body, government, or international organization (in this case, the United Kingdom). Previously Sark was represented by Guernsey's country code (GG). Sark also fought for 20 years to get the .cq country code top-level domain. This domain was chosen because other alternatives like .sk, .sa and .sr were taken by Slovakia, Saudi Arabia and Suriname. CQ comes from the island’s name in Sercquiais (Cerq).

=== Seigneur ===
Christopher Beaumont is the current and 23rd Seigneur of Sark, having inherited the Seigneurie in 2016.

Before the constitutional reforms of 2008, the Seigneur (or Dame in the case of a woman holding the office) was the head of the government of the Isle of Sark. Many of the laws, particularly those related to inheritance and the rule of the Seigneur, had changed little since their promulgation in 1565 under Elizabeth I of England. For example, the Seigneur held the sole right to keep pigeons or an unspayed dog. The latter right was repealed in 2008.

The Seigneur remains the lord of the manor for the island, subject only to the Crown in Right of the Bailiwick of Guernsey as sovereign and liege lord. With the approval of the Lieutenant-Governor of Guernsey, the Seigneur appoints and dismisses Sark's public officers, including the Seneschal, the Prevot, and the Greffier. The Seigneur as chairperson, together with the Seneschal, the Prevot, and the Greffier, comprise a board of trustees for the acquisition, management, and disposition of all property belonging to Chief Pleas. Likewise, the Seigneur has the right to speak at meetings of Chief Pleas, but not to vote, and the right to veto primary legislation before it is presented for royal assent. Chief Pleas may nevertheless override this veto by a simple majority of its duly elected counseillers.

=== Seneschal ===
Until 2013, the Seneschal of Sark was the head of the Chief Pleas. From 1583 and 1675, judicial functions were exercised by five elected jurats and a juge, but since 1675 the Seneschal has also been the judge of the island.

The Seneschal was historically appointed by the Seigneur, but nowadays there is an Appointment Committee consisting of the Seigneur and two other members appointed by the Seigneur.

In 2010, following the decision of the English Court of Appeal, the Chief Pleas decided to split the dual role of the Seneschal. Thus, since 2013, the Chief Pleas has elected its own President, who presides in almost all cases. The Seneschal now presides in Chief Pleas only during the election of the President.

The complete list of all the Seneschals of Sark from 1675 is as follows:

1. Pierre Gibault (15/7/1675–1680)
2. Thomas de Beauvoir (1680–1683)
3. Phillipe Dumeresq (1683–1702)
4. Jean Payne (1702–1707)
5. Philippe de Carteret (1707–1744)
6. Henri de Carteret (1744–1752)
7. Phillipe le Masurier (1752–1777)
8. Henri le Masurier (1777–1785)
9. Amice le Couteur (1785–1808)
10. Jean le Couteur (1808–1812)
11. Jean Falle (1812–1830)
12. Elie le Masurier (1830–1841)
13. Philippe Guille (1841–1851)
14. Thomas Godfray (1851–1876)
15. William de Carteret (1876–1881)
16. Abraham Baker (1881–1891)
17. Thomas Godfray (1891–1920)
18. Kenneth Campbell (1920–1922)
19. Ashby Taylor (1922–1925)
20. Frederick de Carteret (1925–1937)
21. William Carré (1937–1945)
22. William Baker (1945–1969)
23. Bernard Jones (1969–1979)
24. Hilary Carré (1979–1985)
25. Lawrence Philip de Carteret (1985–2000)
26. Reginald J. Guille (2000–2013)
27. Jeremy la Trobe-Bateman (2013–2021)
28. Bethan Owen (2021–2022)
29. Victoria Stamps (2022–present)

=== Tenants ===
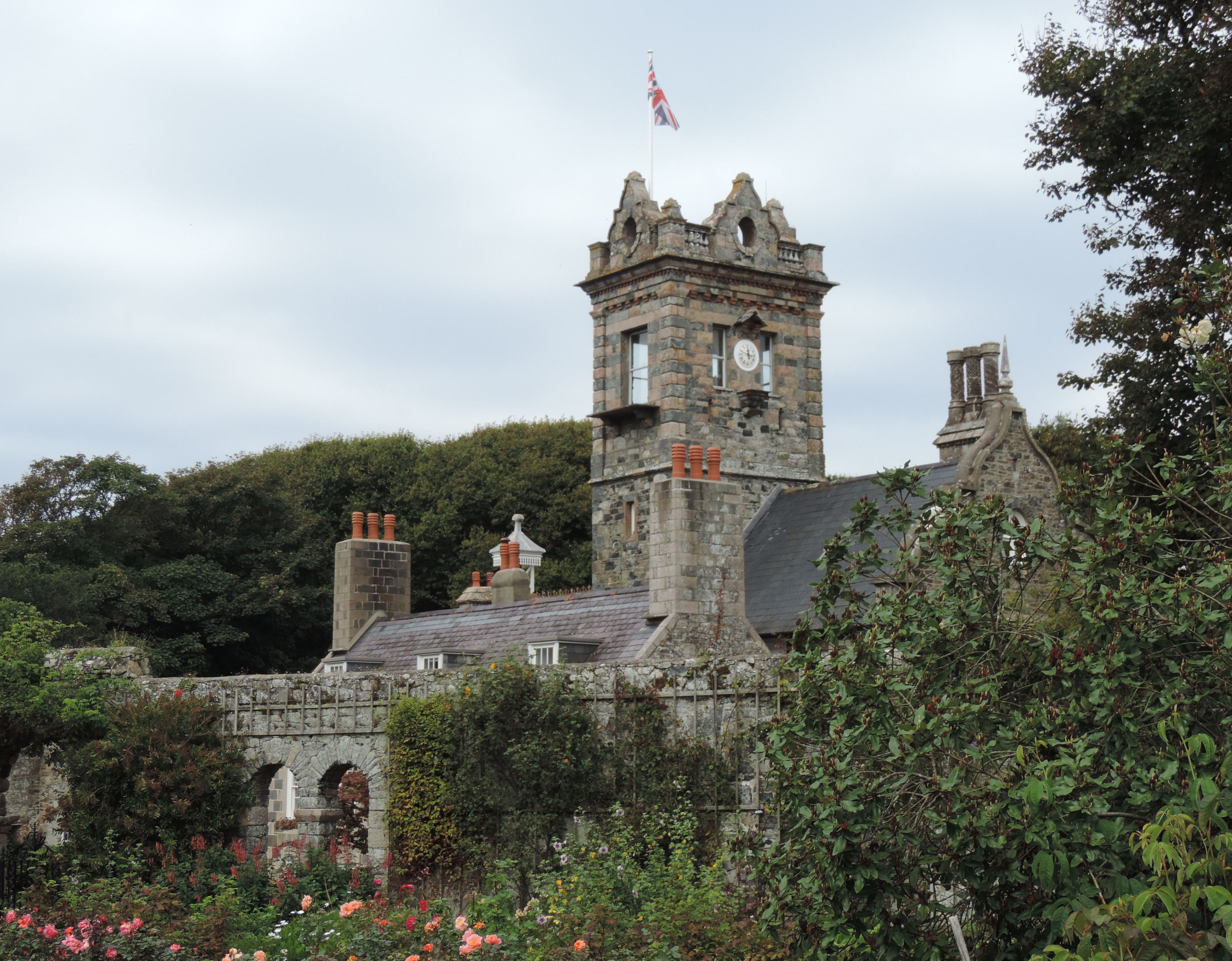
The Seigneurie (49°26.4′N 2°21.7′W)

Pursuant to the royal letters patent, the Seigneur was to keep the island inhabited by at least 40 armed men. Therefore, from his lands, 39 parcels or tenements, each sufficient for one family, were subdivided and granted to settlers, the tenants. Later, some of these parcels were dismembered, and parts of the Seigneurial land were sold, creating more parcels.

Originally each head of a parcel-holding family had the right to vote in Chief Pleas, but in 1604 this right was restricted to the 39 original tenements required by the letters patent, the so-called 'Quarantaine Tenements' (French: quarantaine: a group of 40). The newer parcels mostly did not have the obligation to bear arms. In 1611 the dismemberment of tenements was forbidden, but the order was not immediately followed.

In Sark, the word tenant is used (and often pronounced as in French) in the sense of feudal landholder rather than the common English meaning of lessee. Originally, the word referred to any landowner, but today it is mostly used for a holder of one of the Quarantaine Tenements.

=== Chief Pleas ===
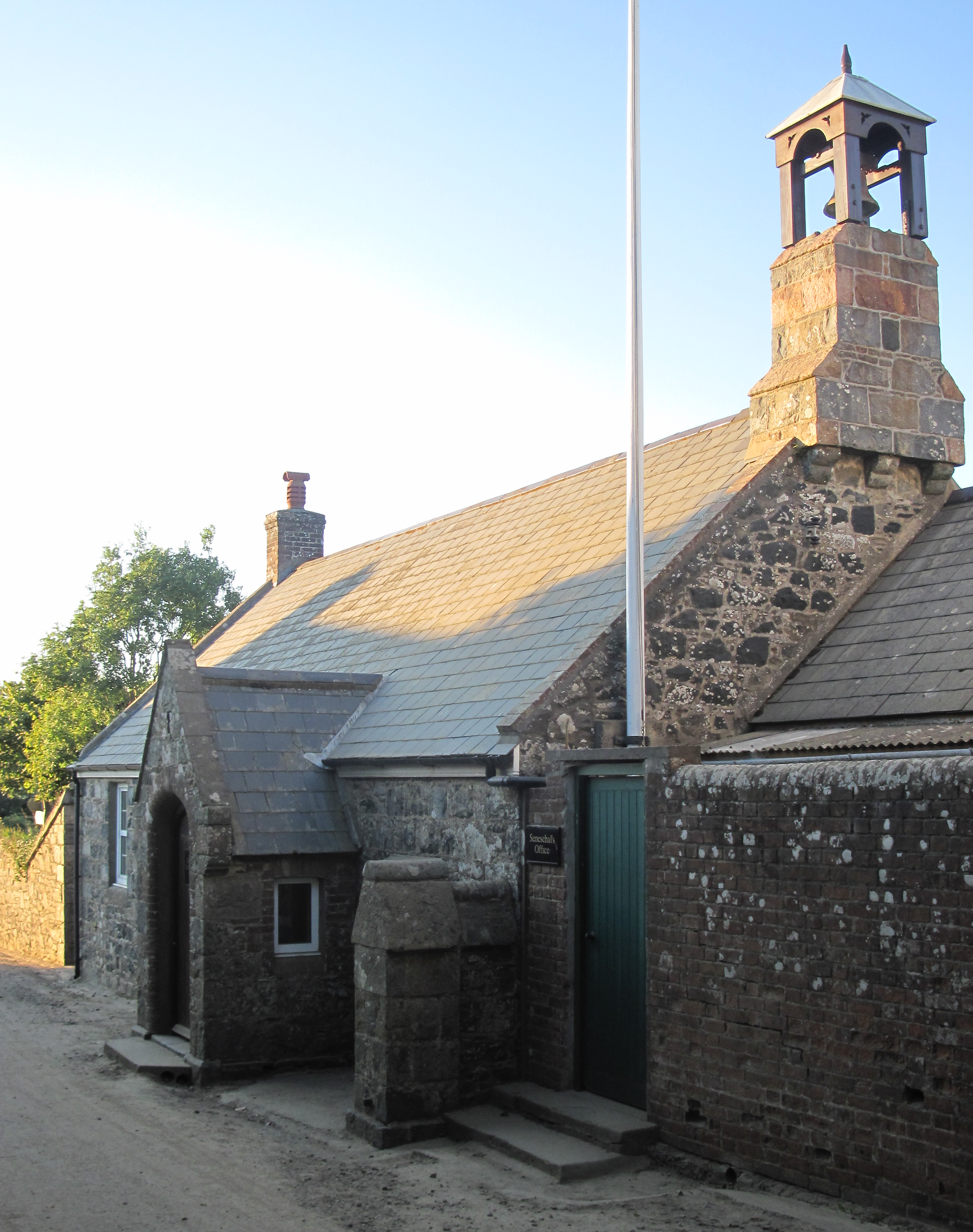
Meeting place for Chief Pleas and the Court of the Seneschal

Chief Pleas (French: Chefs Plaids; Sercquiais: Cheurs Pliaids) is the parliament of Sark. It consists of 18 members (conseillers), elected for a period of office of four years. In addition, the Seigneur and a speaker (who is elected by the conseillers) are counted as members; but they have no right to vote. The periods of office are shifted, with the period of half the conseillers starting in the middle of the periods of the other half. Thus, every second year, nine conseillers are elected for the coming four years. The elections are held on the basis of a single multi-member Sark-wide constituency, with the nine candidates receiving most votes being elected. The Prévôt, the Greffier and the treasurer also attend but are not members; the treasurer may address Chief Pleas on matters of taxation and finance.

However, if there are not more willing candidates than the numbers of positions to fill (including any casual vacancies), then all candidates are declared elected, without any actual election necessary. This happened both in the 2014 and the 2016 elections to the Chief Pleas. The last elections were held on 11 December 2024.

Until 2008, the Chief Pleas consisted of the tenants, and 12 deputies of the people as the only representation of the majority, an office introduced in 1922. The Seigneur and the Seneschal (who presided) were also members of Chief Pleas.

Since 2000, Chief Pleas was working on its own reform, responding to internal and international pressures. On 8 March 2006, by a vote of 25–15, Chief Pleas voted for a new legislature of the Seigneur, the Seneschal, 14 elected landowners and 14 elected non-landowners. However, it was made plain by the British Lord Chancellor, Jack Straw, that this option was not on the table.

Offered two options for reform involving an elected legislature, one fully elected, one with a number of seats reserved for elected tenants, 56% of the inhabitants expressed a preference for a totally elected legislature. Following the poll, Chief Pleas voted on 4 October 2006 to replace the 12 deputies and 40 tenants in Chief Pleas by 28 conseillers elected by universal adult suffrage. This decision was suspended in January 2007 when it was pointed out to Chief Pleas that the 56% versus 44% majority achieved in the opinion poll did not achieve the 60% majority required for the constitutional change. The decision was replaced by the proposal that Chief Pleas should consist of 16 tenants and 12 conseillers both elected by universal adult suffrage from 2008 to 2012 and that a binding referendum should then decide whether this composition should be kept or replaced by 28 conseillers. This proposal was rejected by the Privy Council and the 28 conseiller option was reinstated in February 2008 and accepted by Privy Council in April 2008.

In 2003, Chief Pleas voted to vary the long-standing ban on divorce in the island by extending to the Royal Court of Guernsey power to grant divorces.

In 2017, due to a lack of candidates standing for elections, the number of conseillers was reduced from 28 to 18, with nine elected every two years.

Bailiwick of Guernsey laws and United Kingdom Acts of Parliament can (the latter as in the case of all the other Channel Islands) be extended to Sark. Normally the consent of Chief Pleas is obtained for this, but the Supreme Court ruled in R v Secretary of State for Justice that it need not be. Sark does not make its own criminal laws; the responsibility for making criminal law was assigned to the States of Guernsey by Section 4(3) of the Reform (Sark) Law 2008.

=== Officers ===
The executive officers on the island are:

- The Seneschal (Chief Judge, formerly also President of Chief Pleas) and Deputy
- The Prevôt (Sheriff of the Court and of Chief Pleas) and Deputy
- The Greffier (Clerk) and Deputy
- The Treasurer (Finances) and Deputy
- The Connétable (or Constable) is the senior of two police officers and police administrator and the Vingtenier is the junior police officer.

The Seneschal, Prevôt, and Greffier are chosen by the Seigneur, while the Treasurer, Constable and Vingtenier are elected by Chief Pleas.

The list of current Officers of the Island of Sark:

- Seneschal – Victoria Stamps
  - Deputy Seneschal – Ashley Jarman
- Prévôt – Kevin Adams
  - Deputy Prévôt – Joanne Godwin
- Greffier – Trevor John Hamon
  - Deputy Greffier – Gary Hamon
- Treasurer – Sarah Hudson
- Constable – Glenn Williams
- Vingtenier – David Crossan
- Speaker of Chief Pleas – Paul Armorgie

=== Clameur de haro ===
Among the old laws of the Channel Islands is the old Norman custom of the clameur de haro. Using this legal device, a person can obtain immediate cessation of any action he considers to be an infringement of his rights. At the scene, he must, in front of witnesses, recite the Lord's Prayer in French and cry out "Haro, Haro, Haro! À mon aide mon Prince, on me fait tort!" ("Haro, Haro, Haro! To my aid, my Prince! I am being wronged!"). It should then be registered with the Greffe Office within 24 hours. All actions against the person must then cease until the matter is heard by the Court. The last clameur recorded on Sark was raised in August 2021; this was withdrawn by the claimant in October 2021.

=== Periodicals ===
Since 2009, a resident of Sark has operated a weekly online newspaper called The Sark Newspaper (previously known as The Sark Newsletter). The publisher is a former longtime employee of the wealthy Barclay brothers, who own the small neighbouring island of Brecqhou. The publication has compared the local government of Sark "to fascist Germany in the 1930s". In 2014 over 50 residents of Sark filed complaints with the police about accusations made by the paper.

Since 2011 a quarterly magazine called Sark Life, which promotes a positive view of the island and welcomes contributions, is published by the Sark-based publishing company Small Island Publishing.

== Sercquiais ==
Sercquiais (Sarkese, or sometimes called Sark-French) is a dialect of the Norman language still spoken in 1998 by a few older inhabitants of the island. Its decline has been linked with the arrival of English-speaking miners in 1835, and increased tourism in more recent years.

== Economy ==
=== Tourism and financial services ===
Sark's economy depends primarily on tourism and financial services. Sark has had a private company registry since 2017. The Guernsey Financial Services Commission does not register companies based in Sark.

=== Taxation ===
Sark is fiscally autonomous from Guernsey, and consequently has control over how it raises taxes. There are no taxes on income, capital gains or inheritances. There is also no VAT charged on goods and services, but import duties (Impôts) are charged on some goods brought onto the island at around 70–75% of Guernsey rates. However, the island does levy a Personal Capital Tax, a Property Tax, a Poll Tax ("Landing Tax") on visitors coming to the island, and a Property Transfer Tax (PTT) on residential properties when they are sold.

The island has its own tax assessor (in 2016, this remained Simon de Carteret), who collects the Property Tax, PTT, and the Personal Capital Tax (direct tax). Currently, the Personal Capital Tax ranges from a minimum of £450, to a maximum of £9,000 or 0.39% per annum (whichever is the lower). In 2014, there were five taxpayers who paid the maximum amount of £6,400 (PCT and Property Tax combined), and six who paid zero tax. Residents over the age of 69 do not pay the PCT. If a resident chooses not to declare the value of their personal assets, they can elect to pay a flat-rate under the Forfait method.

In 2006, Property Transfer Tax replaced the feudal Treizième. This used to be calculated by dividing the purchase price of any of the 30 tenements or 40 freehold properties on Sark by 13. The proceeds from doing this were then paid directly to the Seigneur. When the Treizième was abolished, the Chief Pleas introduced an indexed-linked pension of £28,000 per year, payable to the Seigneur.

An individual is considered to be a resident for tax purposes if they have remained on the island for at least 90 days in any tax year.

=== Sark Company Registry ===
Sark has no public company registry, and no company law. In January 2017, a private organisation called the "Sark Company Registry" was set up. The project was initially opposed by the Guernsey Financial Services Commission, but that opposition ended with nothing, since no law could prohibit private registration of companies. None of managers of the private registry or any company registered by them was ever sanctioned.

== Education ==
Sark generally follows the education system of England though this is not strictly adhered to.

Sark has one school, the Sark School, which takes residents from the ages of 4 to 15. School is divided into four classes. Class 1 takes children from the ages of 4 to 7 (reception to year 2), class 2 caters to 7- to 9-year-olds (year 3 to year 4), class 3 has 9- to 14-year-olds (year 5 to year 9) and the older children attend class 4 (years 10 and 11). Pupils wishing to obtain a GCSE or A-level qualification often finish their education in Guernsey or in England. Since 2006, however, a limited number of GCSEs have been offered to pupils at Sark School.

== Population ==
Population census

Year	Pop.	±% p.a.
1821	488	—
1831	543	+1.07%
1841	785	+3.75%
1851	580	−2.98%
1861	583	+0.05%
1871	546	−0.65%
1881	571	+0.45%
1891	570	−0.02%
1901	504	−1.22%

Year	Pop.	±% p.a.
1911	579	+1.40%
1921	611	+0.54%
1931	571	−0.67%
1939	430	−3.48%
1951	555	+2.15%
1961	550	−0.09%
1971	584	+0.60%
2022	562	−0.08%

Note: Sark figures include Brecqhou
Source: Bailiwick of Guernsey, Chief Pleas

Birthplace	1971	2022
Sark/Guernsey	50%	28%
Other Channel Islands	3%	1%
Other British Isles	40%	52%
Abroad	6%	19%

== Transport ==
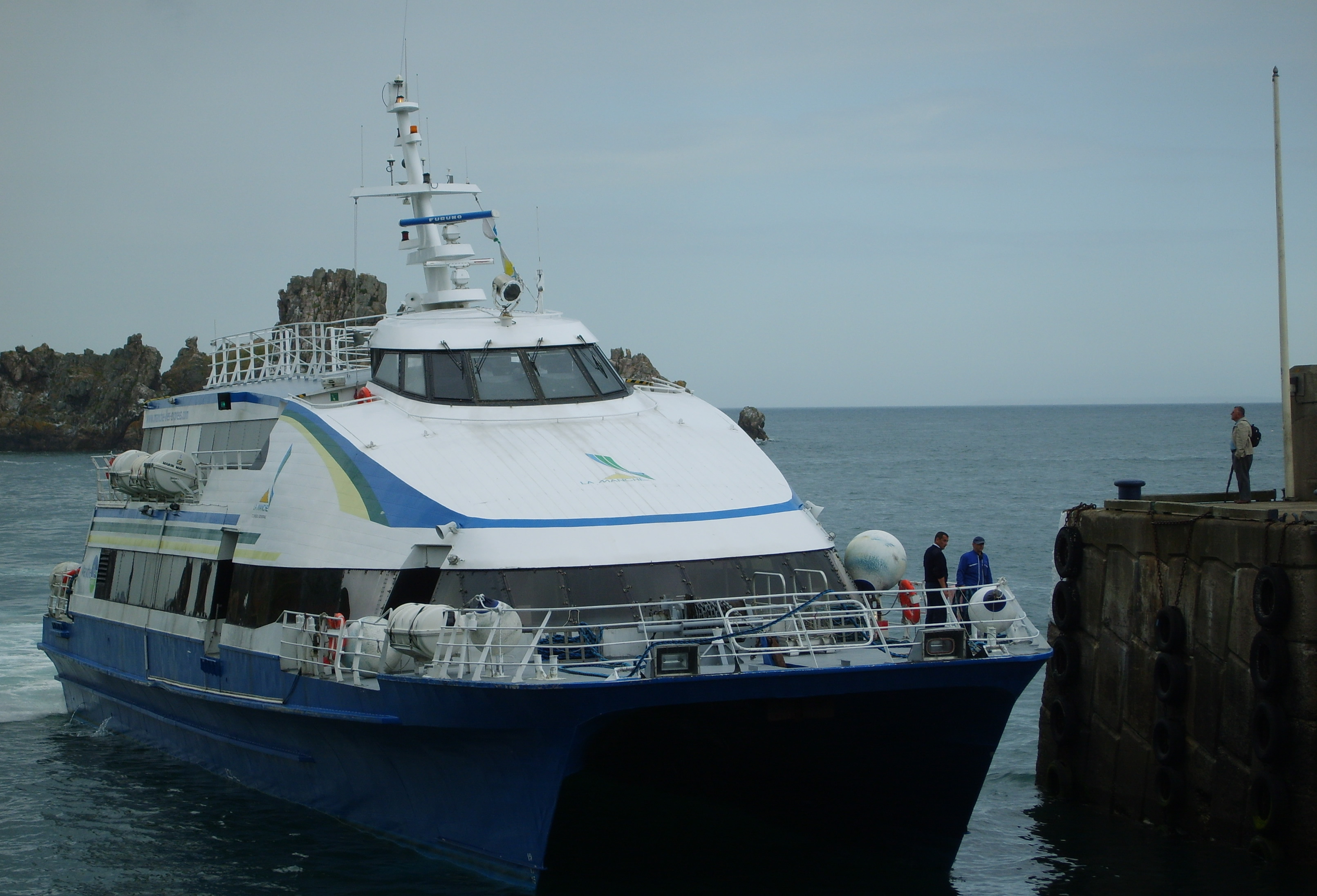
The high-speed ferry service from Jersey arriving at Sark

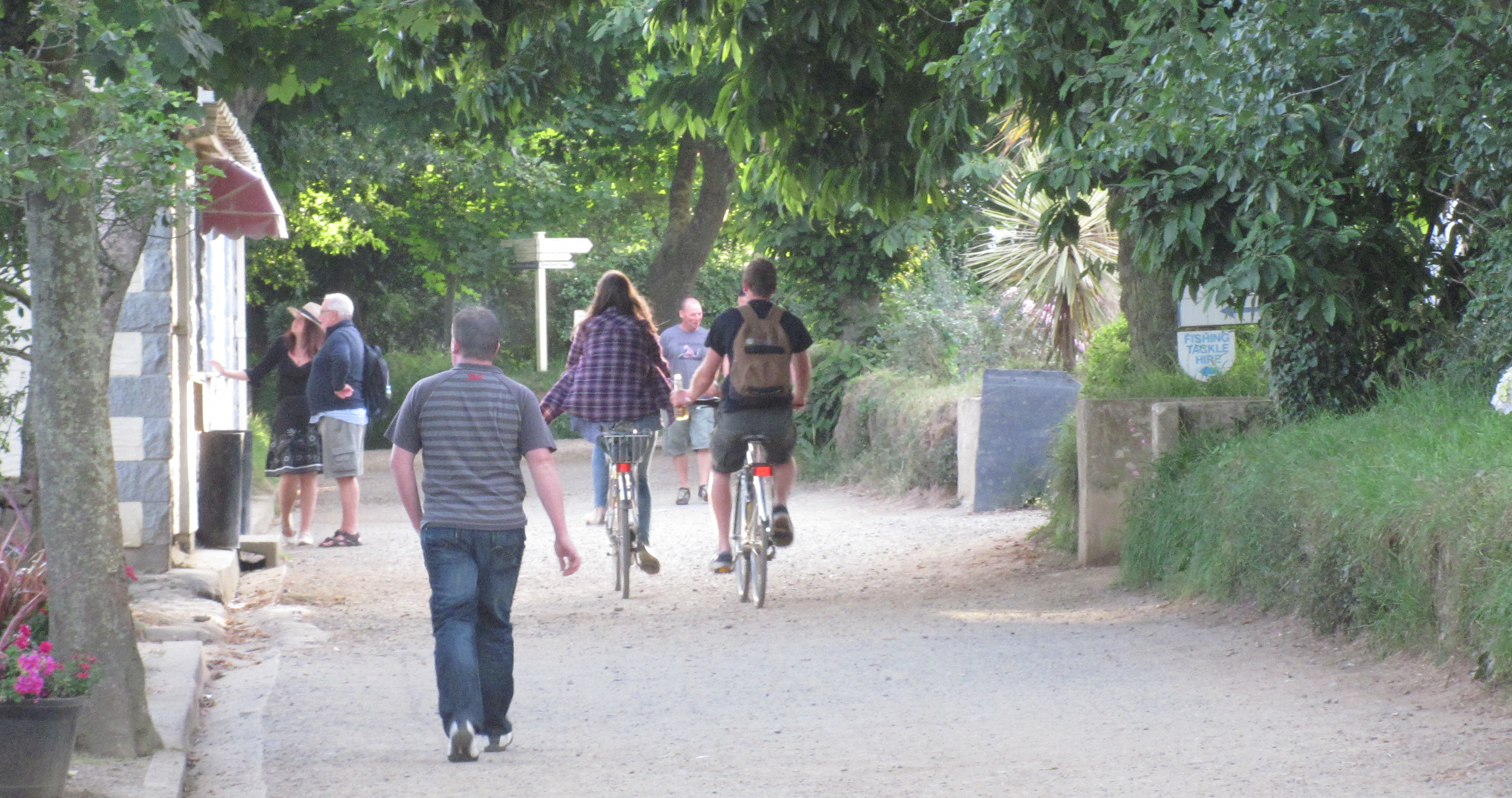
Street scene in Sark

The Isle of Sark Shipping Company operates small ferries from Sark to St Peter Port, Guernsey. The service takes 55 minutes for the 9 miles (14 km) crossing. A high-speed passenger ferry is operated in summer by the French company Manche Iles Express to Saint Helier, Jersey. A 12-passenger boat, the Lady Maris II, operates regular services to Alderney.

The island is a car-free zone where the only vehicles allowed are horse-drawn vehicles, bicycles, tractors, and battery-powered buggies for elderly or disabled people. Electric bicycles were deregulated in the 2019 Midsummer Chief Pleas with the ordinance coming in to force on 4 July 2019. Passengers and goods arriving by ferry from Guernsey are transported from the wharf by tractor-pulled vehicles.

There is no airport on Sark, and flight over Sark below 2400 ft is prohibited by the Air Navigation (Restriction of Flying) (Guernsey) Regulations 1985 (Guernsey 1985/21). The closest airports are Guernsey Airport and Jersey Airport. Sark lies directly in line of approach to the runway of Guernsey airport, however, and low-flying aircraft regularly fly over the island.

== Religion ==
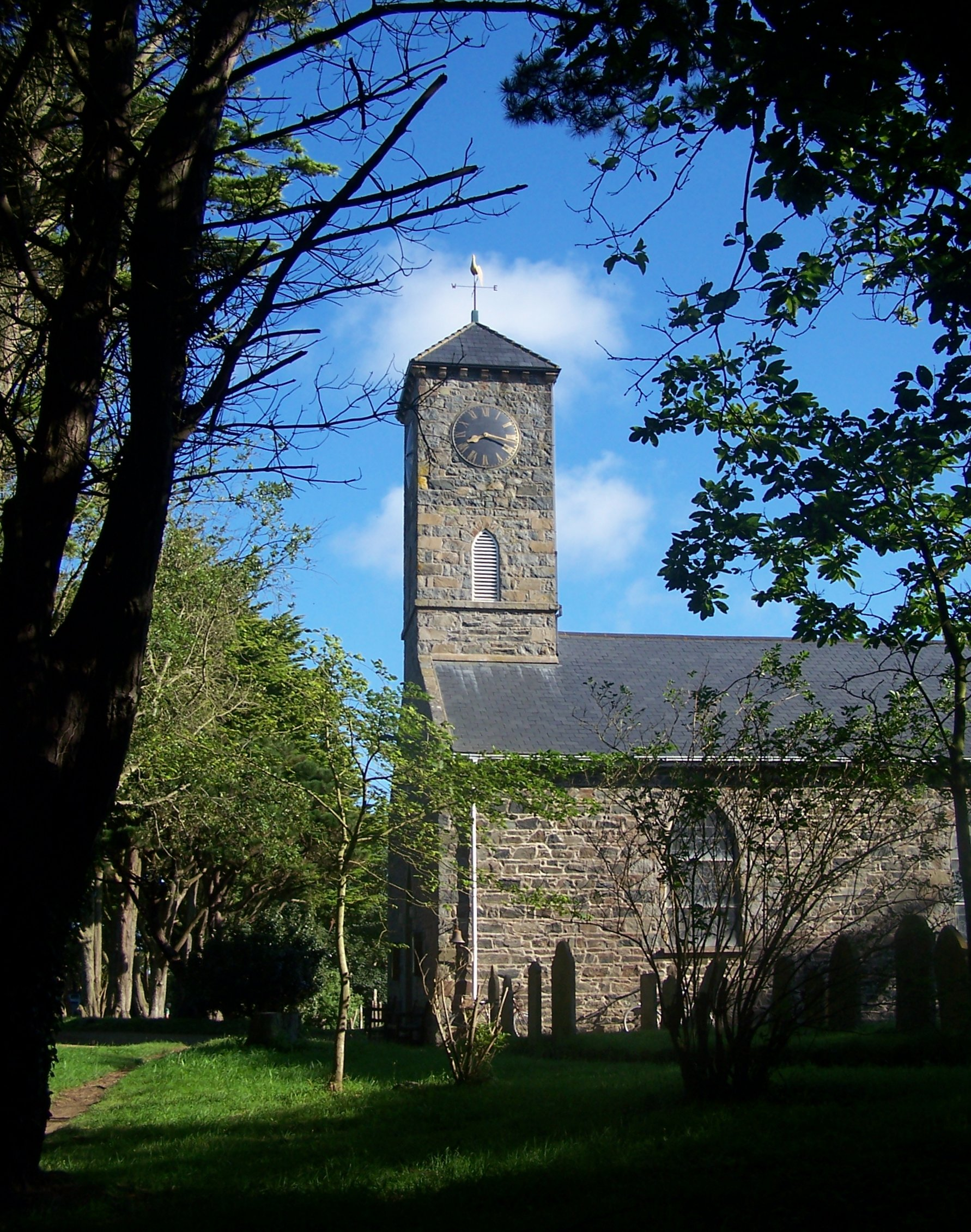
St Peter's Church (Anglican)

In common with the other Channel Islands, Sark is attached to the Anglican diocese of Salisbury. Catholics depend on the Roman Catholic Diocese of Portsmouth in England.

Sark has an Anglican church (St Peter's, built 1820) and a Methodist church. John Wesley first proposed a mission to Sark in 1787. Jean de Quetteville of Jersey subsequently began preaching there, initially in a cottage at Le Clos à Geon and then at various houses around Sark. Preachers from Guernsey visited regularly, and in 1796, land was donated by Jean Vaudin, leader of the Methodist community in Sark, for the construction of a chapel, which Jean de Quetteville dedicated in 1797. In the mid-1800s there was a small Plymouth Brethren assembly. Its most notable member was the biblical scholar William Kelly (1821–1906). Kelly was then the tutor to the Seigneur's children.

Supported by the evidence of the names of the tenements of La Moinerie and La Moinerie de Haut, it is believed that the Seigneurie was constructed on the site of the monastery of Saint Magloire. Magloire had been Samson of Dol's successor as bishop of Dol, but retired and founded a monastery in Sark where he died in the late sixth century. According to the vita of Magloire, the monastery housed 62 monks and a school for the instruction of the sons of noble families from the Cotentin. Magloire's relics were venerated at the monastery until the mid-ninth century when Viking raids rendered Sark unsafe, and the monks departed for Jersey, taking the relics with them.

== Law enforcement ==
Despite Sark having its own legislative assembly, Guernsey has sole responsibility for matters of criminal law under the Sark (Reform) Law 2008. For matters of extreme law enforcement the island calls upon the States of Guernsey Police Service. Sark has a small police station and jail, with two (rarely used) cells available. The island has several police officers permanently stationed on it, the constable (senior officer), the vingtenier (deputy constable), two assistant constables (former constables), two custody officers (special constables) and several special constables. Sark also has access to police services in Guernsey through the designation of a member of the Guernsey Neighbourhood Policing Team as a dedicated point of contact for Sark constables.

== Emergency services ==
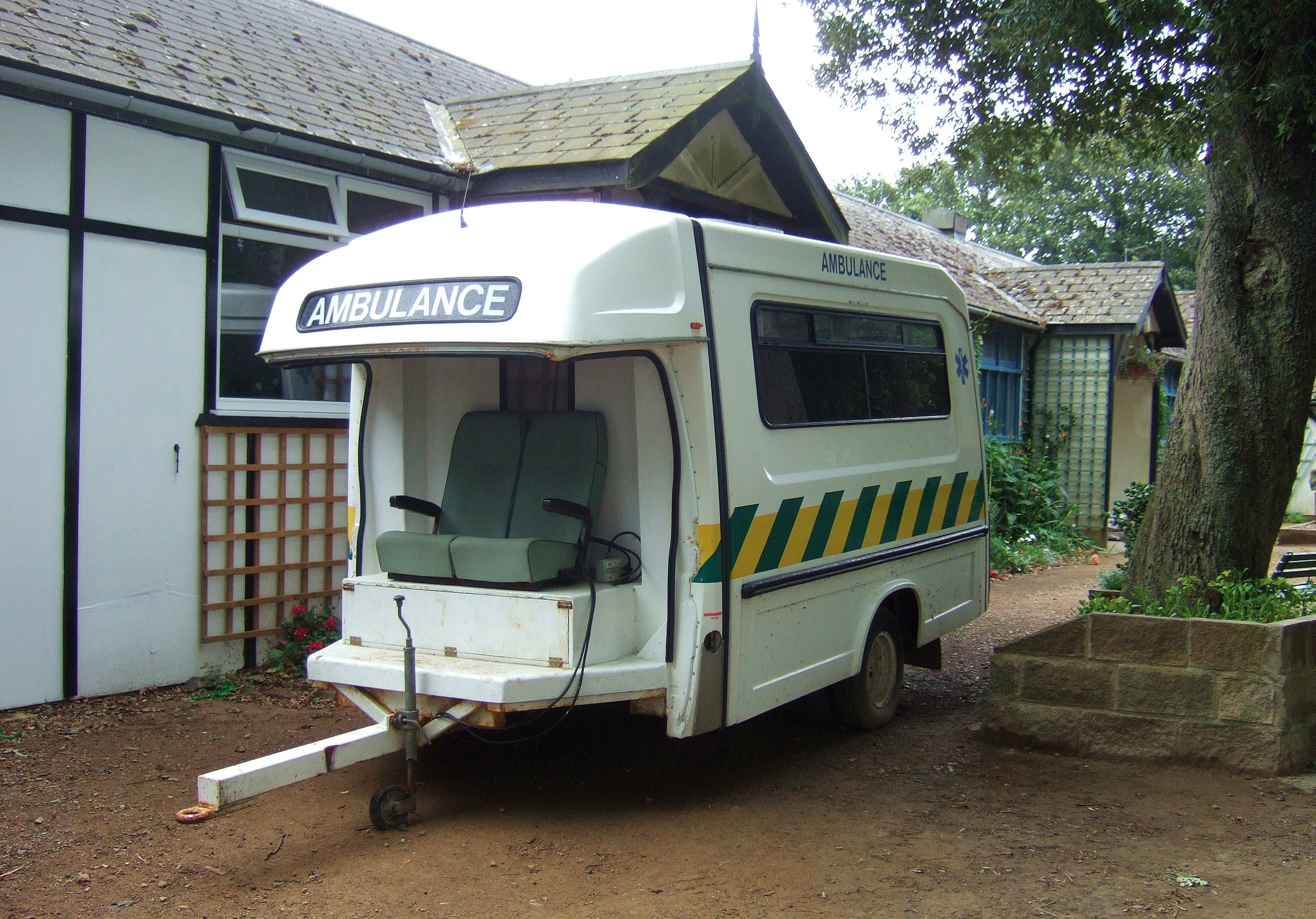
Tractor-drawn emergency ambulance on Sark

A resident doctor provides healthcare on Sark, and is available to attend accidents and emergencies. The Sark Ambulance Service operates two tractor-drawn ambulances, and is able to treat casualties and transport them to the harbour for transfer onto the Guernsey marine ambulance launch, Flying Christine III, operated by Guernsey Ambulance and Rescue Service. A small ambulance station houses the two ambulances.

Fire and rescue services are provided by an independent and volunteer service established in 1958. Originally named 'Sark Fire Brigade', it is now known as the Sark Fire and Rescue Service. The service operates two pump tenders and an all-purpose trailer; all three appliances are drawn by tractors owing to the ban on other motor vehicles on Sark. The original fire station was a large garage. Today the service operates from a large purpose-built fire station on La Chasse Marette.

Lifeboat services are provided by the Royal National Lifeboat Institution from the Guernsey lifeboat station, supported by the RNLI stations on Jersey and Alderney.

== Sport ==
Participation in sport tends towards individual sports rather than team sports, but the population supports a cricket team, a rugby union team and a football team. Sark competes in the biennial Island Games in which the Sark football team has participated. The annual Sark to Jersey Rowing Race is contested by teams from both bailiwicks. Carl Hester, who was brought up in Sark, won a gold medal at the 2012 Summer Olympics in the Individual and Team Dressage events. A Sark post box was painted gold to celebrate the event.

== Sark in media ==
There are many examples of media taking Sark as an inspiration or setting.

=== Norman literature ===
Although there is no record of literature about Sark in Sercquiais, Guernésiais and Jèrriais literature has included writing about Sark; for example by such authors as Edwin John Luce, Thomas Grut, George F. Le Feuvre, and Denys Corbet.

=== English literature ===
- Algernon Swinburne wrote a poem, In Sark, which appears in the collection A Century of Roundels.
- Arthur Conan Doyle's Sir Nigel (1906) includes a sub-plot where Black Simon of Norwich, a man at arms travelling with Sir Nigel Loring to war, obtains permission from Sir Robert Knolles to go ashore to Sark under cover of darkness. He takes his friend the archer Samkin Alward with him and beheads the (so-called) King of Sark in payment of a wager.
- John Oxenham wrote Carette of Sark (1907) and The Perilous Lovers (1924), historical novels largely set on Sark. His 1910 novel A Maid of the Silver Sea uses the mines of Little Sark as its setting.
- The novel Mr Pye, by Mervyn Peake, is set on Sark. The book has been adapted for radio and television. The TV series, filmed on Sark, starred Derek Jacobi and Judy Parfitt, and featured a number of islanders. Peake lived on the island for several years as a painter before he began writing. The setting of his best known novels, the Gormenghast series, may have been inspired by Sark.
- Dame of Sark, the memoirs of the 21st Seigneur Sibyl Mary Hathaway, who was present during the German occupation, were made into a play and television drama of the same name. Dame Sibyl also wrote Maid of Sark, an historical romance published in 1939; set in the 16th century, it incorporates events related to the defence of the island against the Bretons.
- The novel Appointment with Venus by Jerrard Tickell is set on the fictional island of Armorel, which is presumed to be based on Sark. The 1951 film of the book used Sark as a principal location.
- Bill Hopkins' 1957 novel The Divine and the Decay (republished in 1984 under the title The Leap) is set primarily on a fictional island named Vachau. It is believed that Sark was the inspiration for this island. Hopkins went to Sark as part of his research for the novel.
- Sarah Caudwell's The Sirens Sang of Murder (1989) is partly set in Sark, and contains references to John Oxenham's The Perilous Lovers.
- The Last Kings of Sark: A Novel by Rosa Rankin-Gee is a 2015 coming-of-age story set in Sark.
- The 2016 novel Iron Chamber of Memory by John C. Wright is set in Sark.
- In the 2025 novel The Hallmarked Man, the eighth book in the Cormoran Strike series, the lead characters visit Sark.

=== French literature ===
Maurice Leblanc's horror/mystery novel L'Île aux Trente Cercueils (translated in English as The Secret of Sarek) features a French island called Sarek, off the coast of Brittany, which bears obvious geographical similarities to Sark.

=== In music ===
Irish musician, composer and singer Enya's 2015 album Dark Sky Island was inspired by Sark's designation as the first 'dark sky island'. Certain songs on the album, the title track especially, explore the stars, skies and nature.

Dutch electronic musician Legowelt released a three-track 12" single named after the island, "Sark Island Acid", on the American record label L.I.E.S. in 2011.

=== Television ===
- The 1986 television adaptation of Mr Pye by Mervyn Peake and starring Derek Jacobi was filmed on the island. The original novel is also set on Sark.
- Sark featured in the 6th episode of the fourth series of The New Statesman, The Irresistible Rise of Alan B'Stard.
- Part of the seventh episode of the second series of World War II television drama Enemy at the Door takes place in Sark. La Coupée features in a number of scenes.
- Sark, and in particular the Gouliot Caves, features in episode 8 of series 3 of the BBC television series Coast.
- Sark was featured in Episode 3 of the 2009 ITV television series Islands of Britain, presented by Martin Clunes.
- Series 7 and 8 of the BBC Two six-episode television series An Island Parish follows the Anglican priest and Methodist minister on Sark. It was first broadcast in 2013 and 2014.
- One of the episodes of Bergerac called "Burnt" was mostly filmed on Sark. Bergerac was a Jersey-based BBC and Australia's Seven Network detective drama starring John Nettles, filmed between 1981 and 1991. The episode featured a fight on and over the edge of La Coupée.
- The Sark Football Team was featured in one of the episodes of web series "Citation Needed"; Season 7 Episode 2.

== See also ==
- Seigneur of Sark
- Archaeology of the Channel Islands
- Philip Morrell Wilson – American, operated the fraudulent Bank of Sark
