= Last Guardian of Everness =

2004 novel by John C. Wright

- First edition
- Author: John C. Wright
- Cover artist: Justin Sweet
- Language: English
- Series: The War of the Dreaming
- Genre: Fantasy
- Publisher: Tor Books
- Publication date: 2004
- Publication place: United States
- Media type: Print (Hardcover)
- Pages: 332 pp.
- ISBN: 0-312-84871-4
- OCLC: 54500715
- Dewey Decimal: 813/.6 22
- LC Class: PS3623.R54 L37 2004

The Last Guardian of Everness: Being the First Part of the War of the Dreaming is a fantasy novel by American speculative fiction writer John C. Wright, published by Tor Books. It is followed by Mists of Everness.

== Overview ==
The novel tells the tale of Raven, son of Raven, who bargains with a necromancer, Koschei the Deathless, to save the life of his pretty young wife Wendy, who is in the terminal ward of the hospital. The price is that Raven must kill an innocent stranger. The stranger selected is Galen Waylock, the youngest and last watchman of an order of guardians protecting mankind from a supernatural invasion through the Gates of Greater Slumber. The conceit is that man has been separated from the world of dreams in order to preserve him: the fairies and gods remembered in myth yearn to re-establish their old rule.

The story draws on varied mythological sources. Koschei (or Koschey) the Deathless is from Russian folk tales; the Selkie are from Irish lore, the Kelpie, Scottish; Oberon, Titania, and Merlin the Magician, English. The giants Surtvitnir and Bergelmir are Norse. The angels and fallen angels in the story answer either to their Christian or pagan names: The Archangel Uriel, for example, is also called Hyperion, and Apollo the Destroyer.
