= The Golden Oecumene =

Science fiction trilogy by John C. Wright

The Golden Oecumene is a science fiction trilogy by the American writer John C. Wright. It consists of three books, The Golden Age, The Phoenix Exultant and The Golden Transcendence.

== Plot introduction ==
The author's first novel, it revolves around the protagonist Phaethon (full name Phaethon Prime Rhadamanth Humodified (augment) Uncomposed, Indepconsciousness, Base Neuroformed, Silver-Gray Manorial Schola, Era 7043). The novel concerns Phaethon's discovery that parts of his past have been edited out of his mind—apparently by himself.

== Books ==
The Golden Age: A Romance of the Far Future
- First edition cover
- Author: John C. Wright
- Cover artist: Shelley Eshkar
- Series: The Golden Age
- Genre: Hard science fiction
- Publisher: Tor Books
- Publication date: April 20, 2002
- Publication place: United States
- Pages: 304
- ISBN: 0-312-84870-6
- OCLC: 48507898
- Dewey Decimal: 813/.6 21
- LC Class: PS3623.R54 G65 2002
- Followed by: The Phoenix Exultant

=== Book 1: The Golden Age ===
The novel is set tens of thousands of years in the future, 100 centuries after the start of a new era, in a voluntary anarchistic society spanning the Solar System called the Golden Oecumene. Technology makes nearly everyone immortal and tremendously wealthy, except those exiled from society or living outside by choice. The protagonist, Phaethon, is a member of a group, called the Manorials, for whom telepresence has completely replaced the phone and video-phone, as the Manorials travel and communicate as virtual projections on the physical world. The Manorial elites rarely go anywhere in person and live almost always connected to the Mentality, their version of the Internet. The Sophotechs, a superior line of computer intelligences, do most of the work, research, and simulations required by the society. There is only one remaining court, the Curia, and they rarely hear cases since everything can be solved externally by superior Sophotech intelligence and simulation. The entire military is made up of one man, Atkins, who most of the society has forgotten. The most powerful groups are the Hortators and the Peers, although about 90 percent of the society's wealth is controlled by the Sophotechs. The Hortators serve to convince people to act in a way beneficial to society. The Peers are the most wealthy and powerful humans ever to have lived, and they include Phaethon's "father" Helion, who created the Solar Array, a means of mixing the Sun's mass in order to extend the main-sequence hydrogen-burning lifetime of our star.

Phaethon becomes convinced that there is an enemy presence originating from an ancient failed colonization-attempt on another star, and becomes constantly dogged by clandestine enemies. The peaceful Utopian society does not believe in Phaethon's hostile experiences and discoveries, because of the enemy's superior subterfuge and technology. Phaethon must face his memories, the reasons for their loss, and his original dream of space exploration, risk, and enterprise in the face of a powerful, mysterious enemy and his Utopian society that treasures its present safety and stability above all else.

The Phoenix Exultant: or, Dispossessed in Utopia
- First edition cover
- Author: John C. Wright
- Cover artist: Shelley Eshkar
- Series: The Golden Age
- Genre: Hard science fiction
- Publisher: Tor Books
- Publication date: May 16, 2003
- Publication place: United States
- Pages: 304
- ISBN: 0-7653-0432-5
- OCLC: 50645497
- Preceded by: The Golden Age
- Followed by: The Golden Transcendence

=== Book 2: The Phoenix Exultant ===
Phaethon is in exile where he must learn to cope without access to the Mentality, as he believes that there is a virus infecting it that is targeting him. He eventually travels to the island of Ceylon where many exiles are living out their remaining lives. Phaethon finds that not everyone in the solar system agrees with his exile and comes up with a plan to return to his ship the Phoenix Exultant.

A copy of his wife, Daphne tracks him down and between her and the only soldier left in the solar system, we discover the truth about how Phaethon was tricked into exile.

The Golden Transcendence: or, The Last of the Masquerade
- First edition cover
- Author: John C. Wright
- Cover artist: Shelley Eshkar
- Series: The Golden Age
- Genre: Hard science fiction
- Publisher: Tor Books
- Publication date: November 15, 2003
- Publication place: United States
- Pages: 352
- ISBN: 0-7653-0756-1
- OCLC: 52471820
- Preceded by: The Phoenix Exultant

=== Book 3: The Golden Transcendence ===
In the final book of the series, Phaethon must confront the Nothing Sophotech, understand its history in the distortions of an anarchistic society with older roots than his own, and discover how to either liberate it or destroy it—before it destroys or absorbs him and all that he loves.

== Reception ==
Publishers Weekly in their review said "Wright's ornate and conceptually dense prose will not be to everyone's taste but, for those willing to be challenged, this is a rare and mind-blowing treat." Kirkus Reviews had this recommendation in their review saying "this extraordinary feat of invention and plotting would be all the more impressive had the book not ended with the central mystery unresolved, leaving readers dazzled and annoyed in equal measure." Jackie Cassada in her review for Library Journal praised the novel saying it was "bursting with kaleidoscopic imagery, Wright's first novel chronicles the quest of a far-future everyman in his journey of self-discovery. Reminiscent of the panoramic novels of Arthur C. Clarke, Iain Banks, and Jack Vance".

== Allusions ==
The novel includes many classical literary references. Phaethon's name and character as well as his father Helion are direct references to the Greek myth of Phaëton who stole his father's (the sun god Helios) chariot and rode it too close to the Sun. There are also references to works of the science fiction canon: the title and characters conform to the mold established by Robert A. Heinlein in the 1940s and 50s that constituted the "Golden Age" of science fiction. The book's subtitle also describes itself as a "Romance of the far future," a reply to Olaf Stapledon's Last and First Men.
