= Mists of Everness =

Novel by John C. Wright

- Author: John C. Wright
- Cover artist: Justin Sweet
- Language: English
- Series: The War of the Dreaming
- Genre: Fantasy
- Publisher: Tor Books
- Publication date: 2005
- Publication place: United States
- Media type: Print (Hardcover)

Mists of Everness is a 2005 fantasy novel by John C. Wright, a sequel to his novel Last Guardian of Everness. The novel continues the adventures of Raven, Wendy, Lemuel, Peter, and Galen as they save the world from the evil tyrant Morningstar (Satan, Lucifer), they must hand it over to the "good" tyrant Oberon. Mists of Everness gets its title from the mists that fog people's minds, making the magic world/dream world invisible and incorporeal to mortals.

This latest installment in the Chronicles of Everness includes new mythologies: that of the oldtime radio program, "The Shadow," and the three dark gods: Fate, Death, and War.

As in the previous novel, Wright blends classical, Norse, Judeo-Christian, Celtic, Hindu, Persian, and other mythologies into a riveting, though complicated, whole.

Likewise, as in the first novel, Wright contrasts European/Old World mythos with the American ideals of democracy, liberty, and justice. Also, while the books contain mythologies/legendary from around the world (including reference to Hindu beliefs, medieval Muslim knights, and Asian warriors), these books are first and foremost about dreams:

Basically, the world of dreams, aka "magic, myth, and monsters," is a world where the old gods of Europe, Asia, and Africa live on and coexist with the ideas/dreams/stories of J.R.R. Tolkien (with references to Tirion and Vinyamar, called Vindyamar in the book), H. P. Lovecraft, and E.R. Eddison, among others. The theme of the book is that dreams, although powerful and necessary for human sanity, are dangerous if brought into the real world.

What sets Mists of Everness apart from the first book is the depth to which the author goes in describing oneirotech: "Dream-science." With a little dream-power and the aid of the Silver Key, mortals are able to make dreams into matter. The psychology of dreams and the unconscious mind also play a deeper role. For example, one character explains how certain symbols/objects have more power in the dream realm because they are deeply ingrained in the collective unconscious (called "racial subconscious" in the book). Swords work better than guns because a sword has mythic properties about it, connotations that reach back into the psyche of every dreaming human. In other words, swords have a deeper psychological meaning for humans than guns, horses more than cars, etc.

== Possible sequel ==
The author has said that he has a number of ideas for a third book (tentatively called Gates of Everness), but as of 2008 hasn't announced any plans to write it in the immediate future.
