= Orphans of Chaos =

2005 novel by John C. Wright

- Cover of first edition (hardcover)
- Author: John C. Wright
- Language: English
- Series: Chronicles of Chaos
- Genre: Fantasy novel
- Publisher: Tor Books
- Publication date: 20 October 2005
- Publication place: United States
- Media type: Print (Hardcover & Paperback)
- Pages: 320 pp (First edition)
- ISBN: 0-7653-1131-3 (First edition)
- OCLC: 58055187
- Dewey Decimal: 813/.6 22
- LC Class: PS3623.R54 O77 2005
- Followed by: Fugitives of Chaos

Orphans of Chaos is a 2005 science fantasy novel by John C. Wright. It is the first volume of the Orphans of Chaos trilogy that continues with the novels Fugitives of Chaos (2006) and Titans of Chaos (2007).

== Plot synopsis ==
Five orphans – Victor, Amelia, Vanity, Colin, and Quentin (see Names and identities below) – who have spent their lives in a luxurious but strict and secretive British boarding school (Saint Dymphna's School and College for Destitute Children), begin to discover that they are different from the other children that they so rarely see.

Unlike the village children, the five orphans do not age. They can also manipulate their appearances. Throughout the book, they also come to discover that they possess unique paranormal abilities. Victor can control the molecular arrangement of matter. Amelia is a fourth-dimensional being. Vanity can find secret passageways. Colin is a psychic. Quentin is a warlock.

The five also discover that the patrons of the school along with their guardians and teachers are just as human as they themselves, which is to say not at all. The story largely concerns the main characters' investigations and discoveries about an otherworldly power struggle, and their place within it.

== Names and identities ==
Themes of naming and identity, both assumed and genuine, are important in the novel and the trilogy it opens. The five child-protagonists are first known only by simple Latin numerical designations; when they reach school age they are allowed to select names for themselves. ("Secunda," the narrator of the novels, chooses a name that expresses her admiration for Amelia Earhart and her fascination with exploration, geography, and travel.) Only in their teens do the five discover their true identities:

- "Primus," who calls himself Victor Invictus Triumph, learns that he is Damnameneus, one of the Telchines;
- "Secunda," Amelia Armstrong Windrose, is Phaethusa, daughter of the Titan Helios and the nymph Neaera of Myriagon;
- "Tertia," Vanity Bonfire Fair, is the Phaeacian princess Nausicaa, daughter of Alcinuous and Arete;
- "Quartinus," Colin Iblis mac FirBolg, is Prince Phobetor, son of Morpheus and Nepenthe, of Cimmeria;
- Quentin Nemo, is Eidotheus (or Eidotheia), son of Proteus and the Graeae.

Other characters in the novel participate in this pattern of multiple identities. Reginald Boggin, the headmaster of the children's school, is actually Boreas, the ancient Greek personification of the north wind. His staff is composed of a Thessalian witch, a cyclops, and similar exotic beings. The music teacher, Miss Daw, is Thelxiepia the siren. The caretaker, Mr. Glum is the human form of Grendel, the monster from Beowulf. Glum's talking dog is Lelaps, the hunting hound of Artemis.

== Mythology and science fiction ==
Wright bases the cosmology of the novel firmly in the mythology of ancient Greece. Many of the gods are habitually referred to by obscure titles from their respective mythologies. "Lord Mavors," the children's principal antagonist, is Ares or Mars; "Lord Mulciber" is Vulcan. Most of the major deities of the Greek pantheon have roles in the novel and its successors. Many of the secondary figures like Boreas and Orpheus also appear. Decidedly minor personalities also pop up, like Laverna, Corus, and Pherespondus the satyr.

Wright structures his fictional world on the Greeks' primal creation myth, the rebellion of the Olympian gods against their progenitors, Saturn and the other Titans. The author combines this traditional mythology with science-fiction elements. In his cosmos, the Phaiacians are not merely the ancient people familiar from the Odyssey, but a race of otherworldly beings with remarkable abilities. The other four teenage protagonists each derive from a different order of non-human, pre-Olympian life, with their own strange natures and capacities. The Olympians regard them as monsters of Chaos. Wright blends mythological, classical, and Homeric elements with Science Fiction in surprising ways. For example, his Laestrygonians are Martians, while his Atlanteans sail in outer space vessels as well as in submarines below the oceans of the Earth.

== The fourth dimension ==
The novel's narrator, Amelia Windrose (or Phaethusa), is one of a race of beings who experience higher spatial dimensions; the concept of the fourth dimension is extensively and imaginatively developed in the book and its sequels. Wright is to some degree comparable to Rudy Rucker as a science fiction writer who has devoted significant attention to the theme of the fourth dimension.

== Awards and nominations ==
- Kirkus Year's Best list, 2005
- Locus Recommended Reading list, 2005
- Nebula Award finalist in the Best Novel category, 2005

== Release details ==
- 2005, Great Britain, Tor ISBN 0-7653-1131-3, Pub date 20 Oct 2005, Hardcover

== Sources, references, external links, quotations ==
- Home page on sff.net
- Review by JP at SFSignal
- Orphans of Chaos Dramatis Personae chart
