= 2024 Sark general election =

Partial general elections were held in Sark on 11 December 2024 to elect nine of the eighteen conseillers of the Chief Pleas. Notice of the election was published on 8 November 2024 and nominations was open from 25 to 29 November. They were the first elections after the voting age was lowered to 16.

== Results ==
Candidate	Votes	%
Michael John Locke	179	75.85
Natalie Tighe	171	72.46
Christopher Howard Bateson	170	72.03
David Charles Peter Curtis	154	65.25
Edric Baker	138	58.47
Mary Furness Nicolle	133	56.36
James Turner Martin	130	55.08
Steven George Lord	108	45.76
Frank William Makepeace	88	37.29
Tony Eric Le Lievre	87	36.86
Sandra Williams	85	36.02
Helen Anne Sturman	84	35.59
Alan Leslie George Blythe	75	31.78
Paul Joseph Williams	61	25.85
Nicolas John Patrick Moloney	47	19.92
Total	1,710	100.00
Valid votes	236	98.33
Invalid/blank votes	4	1.67
Total votes	240	100.00
Registered voters/turnout		66
Source: Chief Pleas
