= John C. Wright (author) =

American speculative fiction writer (born 1961)

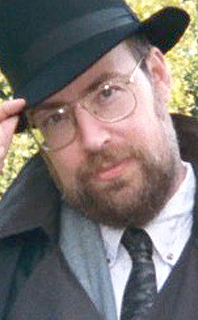
- Wright in 2006
- Born: John Charles Justin Wright; October 22, 1961 (age 64); Chula Vista, California, U.S.
- Education: St. John's College (BS); William & Mary Law School (JD)
- Occupation: Writer
- Spouse: L. Jagi Lamplighter
- Children: 4
- Writing career
- Period: 1994–present (speculative fiction)
- Genre: Science fiction (notably space opera)
- Website: scifiwright.com

John C. Wright (born October 22, 1961) is an American writer of science fiction and fantasy novels. He was a Nebula Award finalist for his fantasy novel Orphans of Chaos. Publishers Weekly said he "may be this fledgling century's most important new SF talent" when reviewing his debut novel, The Golden Age.

== Early life ==
John Charles Justin Wright was born on October 22, 1961, in Chula Vista, California. He studied the Great Books at St. John's College in Annapolis, Maryland, graduating in 1984. He received his Juris Doctor degree from William & Mary Law School in 1987.

== Career ==
Wright was admitted to the practice of law in three jurisdictions, New York, May 1989; Maryland, December 1990; Washington, D.C., January 1994. After his law practice was unsuccessful, he went to work for the newspaper St. Mary's Today.

Wright later worked as a newspaperman and newspaper editor before venturing into writing genre fiction. When reviewing his debut novel The Golden Age, Publishers Weekly said he "may be this fledgling century's most important new SF talent"

Wright has also worked as a technical writer in Virginia.

== Awards ==
Wright's Orphans of Chaos was nominated for the 2005 Nebula Award for Best Novel, losing to Joe Haldeman's Camouflage.

In 2015, as a part of the Rabid Puppies slate, Wright received five Hugo Award nominations, including three in the Best Novella category ("One Bright Star to Guide Them," "The Plural of Helen of Troy," and "Pale Realms of Shade"), a fourth for Best Short Story ("The Parliament of Beasts and Birds"), and a fifth for Best Related Work (Transhuman and Subhuman: Essays on Science Fiction and Awful Truth). All his works were ranked below "No Award".

On September 4, 2016, Wright's novel Somewhither (published by Castalia House) received the first Dragon Award for Best Science Fiction Novel.

== Personal life ==
At age 42, Wright converted from atheism to Catholicism, citing a profound religious experience with visions of the "Virgin Mary, her son, and His Father, not to mention various other spirits and ghosts over a period of several days", and stating that prayers he made were answered. In 2008, he was received into the Roman Catholic Church, of which he approvingly said: "If Vulcans had a church, they'd be Catholics."

Wright is married to writer L. Jagi Lamplighter, and they have four children.

== Novels ==
=== The Golden Oecumene ===
- The Golden Age (2002)
- The Phoenix Exultant (2003)
- The Golden Transcendence (2003)

=== War of the Dreaming ===
- Last Guardian of Everness (2004)
- Mists of Everness (2005)

=== Chronicles of Chaos ===
- Orphans of Chaos (2005)
- Fugitives of Chaos (2006)
- Titans of Chaos (2007)

=== Count to the Eschaton Sequence ===
- Count to a Trillion (2011)
- The Hermetic Millennia (2012)
- The Judge of Ages (2014)
- Architect of Aeons (April 21, 2015)
- The Vindication of Man (November 22, 2016)
- Count to Infinity (December 26, 2017)

=== Tales of Moth and Cobweb ===
- The Green Knight's Squire
  - Swan Knight's Son (2016)
  - Feast of the Elfs (2016)
  - Swan Knight's Sword (2016)
- The Dark Avenger's Sidekick
  - Daughter of Danger (2017)
  - City of Corpses (2017)
  - Tithe to Tartarus (2017)
- The Mad Scientist's Intern (Forthcoming)
- The Ghostly Father's Novice (Forthcoming)

=== A Tale of the Unwithering Realm ===
- Somewhither (2015)
- Nowhither: The Drowned World (2019)

=== Lost on the Last Continent ===
- Terrors of Pangaea (2020)
- Giants of Pangaea (2020)
- Gods of Pangaea (2020)

=== Other novels ===
- Null-A Continuum (sequel to A. E. van Vogt's The World of Null-A, 2008)
- Somewhither: A tale of the Unwithering Realm (2015)
- The Iron Chamber of Memory (2016)

== Stories in the Night Land setting ==
- "Awake in the Night," (novella) William Hope Hodgson's Night Lands: Eternal Love, edited by Andy W. Robertson, Wildside Press.
- "The Cry of the Night Hound," (novella) William Hope Hodgson's Night Lands: Nightmares of the Fall, also edited by Robertson.
- "Silence of the Night," as of 2008 only published on Robertson's Nightland.co.uk website.
- "The Last of All Suns," (novella) William Hope Hodgson's Night Lands: Nightmares of the Fall.
- Awake in the Night Land, Castalia House.

== Other publications ==
- "Farthest Man from Earth", (novella) Asimov's Science Fiction, Vol. 19 # 4 & 5, No.229-230, April 1995.
- "Guest Law", (novella) Asimov's Science Fiction, Vol. 21 # 6, No.258, June 1997.
  - Reprinted in Year's Best SF 3, ed. David G. Hartwell, HarperPrism, 1998, and in The Space Opera Renaissance.
- "Not Born a Man", (short story) Aberrations, No. 24, October 1994.
  - Reprinted in No Longer Dreams, ed. Danielle McPhail, Lite Circle, 2005.
- "Forgotten Causes", (short story) Absolute Magnitude, No. 16, Summer 2001.
  - Reprinted in Breach the Hull, ed. Mike McPhail, Marietta, 2007.
- "Father's Monument", (short story) No Longer Dreams, ed. Danielle McPhail, Lite Circle, 2005.
- "The Kindred", (short story) No Longer Dreams, ed. Danielle McPhail, Lite Circle, 2005.
- "Peter Power Armor", (short story) Breach the Hull, ed. Mike McPhail, Marietta, 2007.
- "Choosers of the Slain", (short story) Clockwork Phoenix: Tales of Beauty and Strangeness, ed. Mike Allen, Norilana Books, 2008.
- "One Bright Star to Guide Them", (short story) The Magazine of Fantasy & Science Fiction, Vol. 116, No. 4 & 5, Whole No. 682, April/May 2009.
- "The Far End of History", (novella) The New Space Opera 2, Gardner Dozois and Jonathan Strahan, Harper Voyager, June 2009.
- "Guyal the Curator", (short story) Songs of the Dying Earth, ed. George R. R. Martin and Gardner Dozois, Subterranean Press, July 2009.
- "A Random World Of Delta Capricorni Aa, Also Called Scheddi", (flash fiction), Flash Fiction Online, May 2010.
- "Judgement Eve", (novelette) Engineering Infinity, ed. Jonathan Strahan, Solaris Books, December 2010.
