= 2008 Sark general election =

- 10 December 2008

28 of the 30 seats in the Chief Pleas
- Registered: 474
- Turnout: 412 (86.92%)
	First party	Second party
Party	Traditionalist	Pro-Barclay brothers
Seats won	23	5
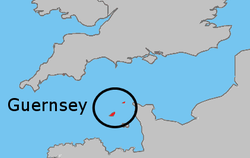
- The location of the Bailiwick of Guernsey which includes Sark

General elections were held in Sark on 10 December 2008, the first elections on the island.

Fifty-seven candidates (12% of the 474 eligible electors) stood for 28 seats in the Chief Pleas. The elected members in the new Chief Pleas were titled Conseillers and replaced the mixed system of elected People's Deputies and ex officio Tenants in the outgoing Chief Pleas. The President of the Chief Pleas continued to be the Seneschal, whose term was extended from three years to life. The Conseillers elected in 2008 served either four or two-year terms. 14 Conseillers elected for two-year terms served until the 2010 election, held in December 2010; while the remainder served four years terms, thus achieving a rolling election cycle. The selection of which Conseillers elected in 2008 were to serve a two-year term or a four-year term was determined by random ballot.

A recount took place on 11 December due to the closeness of the votes for the 28th seat.

== Background ==
On 16 January and 21 February 2008, the Chief Pleas approved a law which introduced a 30-member chamber, with 28 elected members and two unelected members. On 9 April 2008 the Privy Council approved the Sark law reforms, and the new chamber convened for the first time on 21 January 2009.

== Electoral system ==
The first election held in Sark under the new system took place on 10 December 2008. In total, 28 Conseillers were to be elected via plurality block voting from 57 candidates, with the latter figure representing about 12% of the electorate in the island. A recount was ordered as several of the candidates for the last seat were separated by only a few votes.

== Results ==
The elections reflected the division throughout the island between those who supported the traditional system (Pro-Reform Law 2008 Candidates, or the establishment), and those who supported further reforms advocated by the Barclay brothers (Anti-Reform Law 2008 Candidates).

Party	Votes	%	Seats
Traditionalist			23
Pro-Barclay brothers			5
Seigneur (Hereditary)			1
Seneschal (Appointed)			1
Total			30
Valid votes	410	99.51	
Invalid/blank votes	2	0.49	
Total votes	412	100.00	
Registered voters/turnout	474	86.92	
Source: BBC, BBC

=== By candidate ===
After the results of the ballot were declared, a separate ballot was held among the 28 successful Conseillers to determine which would serve for two years, and which for four years, which is indicated by the figure after the number of votes. Since the initial period, Conseillers have served four-year terms with half elected every two years.

Candidate	Party	Votes	%	Term
David Thomas Cocksedge		334	81.46	2
Rossford John de Carteret		316	77.07	4
Helen Mildred Plummer		301	73.41	2
David Woods Melling		283	69.02	2
Helen Clair Magell		280	68.29	4
Christopher Howard Bateson		279	68.05	2
Antony Dunks		267	65.12	4
Stephen Laurence Henry		265	64.63	4
David Pollard		262	63.90	4
Andrew Charles Prevel		262	63.90	4
Sandra Williams	Traditionalist	254	61.95	4
Elizabeth Mary Dewe		252	61.46	4
Edric Baker	Traditionalist	249	60.73	2
Paul Williams		248	60.49	4
Diane Baker		233	56.83	2
Richard James Dewe		231	56.34	2
Paul Martin Armorgie		229	55.85	4
Andrew James Cook		228	55.61	4
Charles Noel Donald Maitland		227	55.37	4
Michelle Andrée Perrée		223	54.39	2
Christopher Robert Nightingale		214	52.20	2
Janet Mary Guy	Traditionalist	211	51.46	2
John Edward Hunt		211	51.46	2
Ann Atkinson		205	50.00	4
Anthony Granville Ventress		201	49.02	2
Stefan Bernd Gomoll		200	48.78	2
Christine Dorothy Audrain		195	47.56	4
Peter John Cole		183	44.63	2
Philip James Carré		179	43.66	
Tony Eric le Lievre		178	43.41	
William George Raymond		168	40.98	
Peter Blayney Stisted		168	40.98	
Bertha Helen Cole		165	40.24	
Simon Peter Elmont	Pro-Barclay brothers	146	35.61	
Bernard John Southern		136	33.17	
Kevin Patrick Delaney	Pro-Barclay brothers	132	32.20	
Simon Ashley Couldridge		125	30.49	
Peter Francis Luce Tonks		123	30.00	
John Trevor Greer Donnelly		119	29.02	
Paul David Mitchell Burgess		117	28.54	
Roger Ian Wynne Kemp		108	26.34	
Colin Francis John Guille		105	25.61	
Belinda Doyle		97	23.66	
Michael Joseph Doyle		93	22.68	
Natalie Tighe		91	22.20	
Mini McCusker		90	21.95	
Fiona Ann Bird		90	21.95	
Cheryl Mary Tonks		85	20.73	
Natalie Alexandra Criak		82	20.00	
Daniel Walter Robert Parsons		77	18.78	
Kaye Jin Mee Char		74	18.05	
David John Bird		73	17.80	
Kevin Laws		70	17.07	
Jamie Karl John Swanson		50	12.20	
Leigh Dianne Gibbins		45	10.98	
Susan Christine Strachey		43	10.49	
Javie John Dance		14	3.41	
Total		9,886	100.00	
Source: BBC

== Reaction of the Barclay brothers ==
When it became apparent that only about five candidates they had supported had been elected, the Barclay brothers announced that they were shutting down their businesses on Sark – hotels, shops, estate agents and building firms – leaving about 100 people, or a sixth of the population, out of work. The closures started almost immediately following the announcement. Diana Beaumont, the wife of Seigneur John Michael Beaumont, commented that "[the Barclay brothers] were the ones that started all this democracy business, now they don’t like it because they haven't won." The States of Jersey, sitting in session on 12 December 2008, resolved to send a message of support to its sister island of Sark.

In January 2009, the Barclays quietly began reversing the shutdown process.
