= Constitution of Sark =

Supreme law of Sark

The Constitution of Sark is unwritten. Sark's constitutional status is largely independent of Guernsey.

The constitution of Sark was reformed by the Reform (Sark) Law 2008. This law was successfully challenged by David and Frederick Barclay, on the ground that the dual role of the office of Seneschal, as President of the Chief Pleas and chief judge, was incompatible with article 6 of the European Convention on Human Rights. The Reform (Sark) (Amendment) (No 2) Law was enacted in response in 2010, removing the right of the Seneschal to serve in the Chief Pleas.
