= L. Jagi Lamplighter =

American novelist

- Education: St. John's College
- Occupations: Writer; editor
- Spouse: John C. Wright
- Children: 4
- Writing career
- Genres: Children's literature; fantasy
- Website: www.ljagilamplighter.com

L. Jagi Lamplighter is an American children's and fantasy writer and editor.

== Personal life ==
Lamplighter graduated from St. John's College in Annapolis, Maryland. She is married to fellow author John C. Wright, and has four children. Lamplighter is a Christian Scientist.

== Works ==
=== Prospero's Daughter trilogy ===
Lamplighter's first three published novels form the Prospero's Daughter trilogy, whose narrator Miranda is the daughter of the magician Prospero from Shakespeare's The Tempest. Set in the present day, it portrays Miranda and her siblings attempting to rescue their father from a Hell similar to Dante's Inferno.

The trilogy received favorable starred reviews in Publishers Weekly, which called the third novel "a satisfyingly epic combination of mythology, theology, and Shakespeare" and "intricate, intellectual fantasy at its best". Kirkus Reviews gave the first novel a mixed review, calling the protagonists unpleasant, distant and cold, but was more favorably disposed towards the two other novels. The series has been mentioned in an article in Shakespeare Studies as "exemplifying the lure of reimagining Shakespeare's characters and their lives".

- Prospero Lost (August 4, 2009): ISBN 978-0-7653-1929-6
- Prospero in Hell (August 17, 2010): ISBN 978-0-7653-1930-2
- Prospero Regained (September 13, 2011): ISBN 978-0-7653-1931-9

=== Books of Unexpected Enlightenment ===
The series follows the adventures of Rachel Griffin, the teenage daughter of an English duke who is attending Roanoke Academy for the Sorcerous Arts, a magic school based vaguely on St. John's College in Annapolis, Maryland, but set in New York's Hudson Highlands.

The series includes:

- The Unexpected Enlightenment of Rachel Griffin, September 2013, ISBN 1937051870
- The Raven, the Elf, and Rachel, October 2014, ISBN 1937051994
- Rachel and the Many-Splendored Dreamland, October 2016, ISBN 0997646012
- The Awful Truth About Forgetting, November 2017, ISBN 0997646039

=== Other works ===
Lamplighter has published several fantasy short stories, including in the Bad Ass Faeries series of anthologies which she co-edits.
