= Chief Pleas =

Parliament of Sark

- Seal of the Chief Pleas

Type
- Type: Unicameral
- Established: c. 1579

Leadership
- Seigneur: Christopher Beaumont
- Speaker: Paul Armorgie
- Deputy Speaker: Theodore Leworthy

Structure
- Seats: 20
- Political groups: Independent (18); Ex officio (2)
- Committees: Committees of Sark: Agriculture, Environment & Sea Fisheries; Development Control; Douzaine; Education; Harbours, Shipping & Pilotage; Medical & Emergency Services; Policy & Finance; Scrutiny Management; Tourism (including Public Health)

Elections
- Last election: 2024
- Next election: Before January 2027

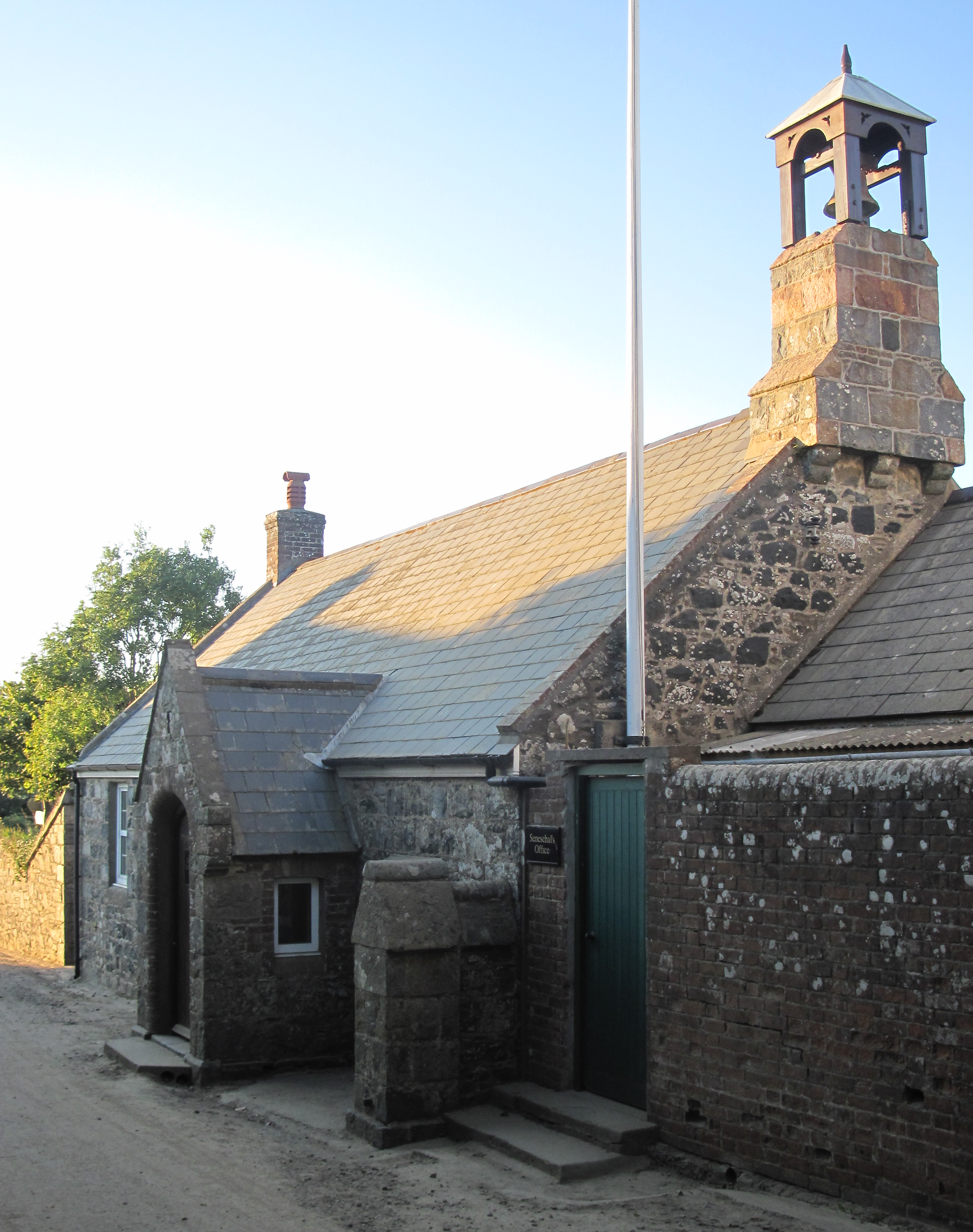
Meeting place for Chief Pleas and the Court of the Seneschal

The Chief Pleas is the parliament and legislature of the island of Sark, part of the Bailiwick of Guernsey in the Channel Islands. It is a non-partisan assembly of 20 members. The current speaker of the Chief Pleas is Paul Armorgie, who was elected in 2023.

== History ==
The Chief Pleas was founded sometime prior to 1597. At the time, the legislature was not elected, consisting of the hereditary Seigneur, the Seneschal (then appointed by the Seigneur) and the forty tenement owners of the island. The Chief Pleas met infrequently to hear the pleas of its members, hence its name. In 1922, the parliament was expanded to include 12 Deputies, who why elected by popular vote. Only non-tenants could stand as candidates. In 1957, 12 Peoples' Deputies were introduced after residents appealed to the Lieutenant Governor of Guernsey.

Notably, Sark was the last jurisdiction on Earth to abolish its feudal regime. In 2006, the Chief Pleas voted 25 to 15 to reform the legislature. The reforms would see its membership reduced from 52 to 28, with 14 landowners and 14 residents being elected. The legislation came into effect in 2008 when it was endorsed by the Privy Council. Sark held its first democratic election to the Chief Pleas on the 10 December 2008.

The Chief Pleas was reformed further in 2010, when the role of Seneschal was split. Beforehand, the Seneschal was both the president of the Chief Pleas as well as the chief judge. The change was decided after concerns that the mixed role did not comply with human rights law. The reform came into effect in 2013.

== Structure ==
The Chief Pleas has 20 members, 18 directly elected Conseillers, the Speaker (elected by the Conseillers) and the Seigneur. Both the Speaker and the Seigneur are non-voting members.

=== Conseillers ===
Conseillers are elected for a term of four years. Elections take place every 2 years, with half of the total seats being contested. The most recent election took place in 2024, with the next due sometime before January 2027.

Below is a list of the current serving Conseillers:

Conseillers	Term ends
Helen Plummer	2027
John Guille	2027
Jolie Rose	2027
Carol Cragoe	2027
Nick Moloney	2027
Karl Rang	2027
Patrick Dewe	2027
John Perrée	2027
Michael Lanyon	2027
Mike Locke	2029
Natalie Tighe	2029
Chris Bateson	2029
David Curtis	2029
Edric Baker MBE	2029
Vacant (formerly Mary Nicholle) (Note: Mary Nicholle is no longer a Conseiller as of 8 July 2026)	2029
James Martin	2029
Frank Makepeace	2029
Sam Keyte	2029

=== Ex officio members ===
Member	Office
Christopher Beaumont	Seigneur
Paul Armorgie	Speaker of Chief Pleas

== Leadership ==
=== Presidents of Chief Pleas (2013–2017) ===
Officeholder	Title	Term begin	Term end	Reference
Reginald Guille	President of Chief Pleas	27 February 2013	5 October 2016	
Arthur Rolfe	President of Chief Pleas	5 October 2016	27 February 2017	

=== Speakers of Chief Pleas (2017–present) ===
Officeholder	Title	Term begin	Term end	Reference
Arthur Rolfe	Speaker of Chief Pleas	27 February 2017	27 February 2020	
Reginald Guille	Speaker of Chief Pleas	27 February 2020	27 February 2023	
Paul Armorgie	Speaker of Chief Pleas	27 February 2023	Present	

== Committees ==
The Chief Pleas operates a number of committees on various areas of administration of the island. These committees are made up of Conseillers, with some having additional non-Chief Pleas members.

The committees are listed below:

- Agriculture, Environment & Sea Fisheries
- Development Control
- Douzaine
- Education
- Harbours, Shipping & Pilotage
- Medical & Emergency Services
- Policy & Finance
- Scrutiny Management
- Tourism (incl. Public Health)

== See also ==
- Sark#Chief Pleas
