= Sark during the German occupation of the Channel Islands =

Aspect of World War II history

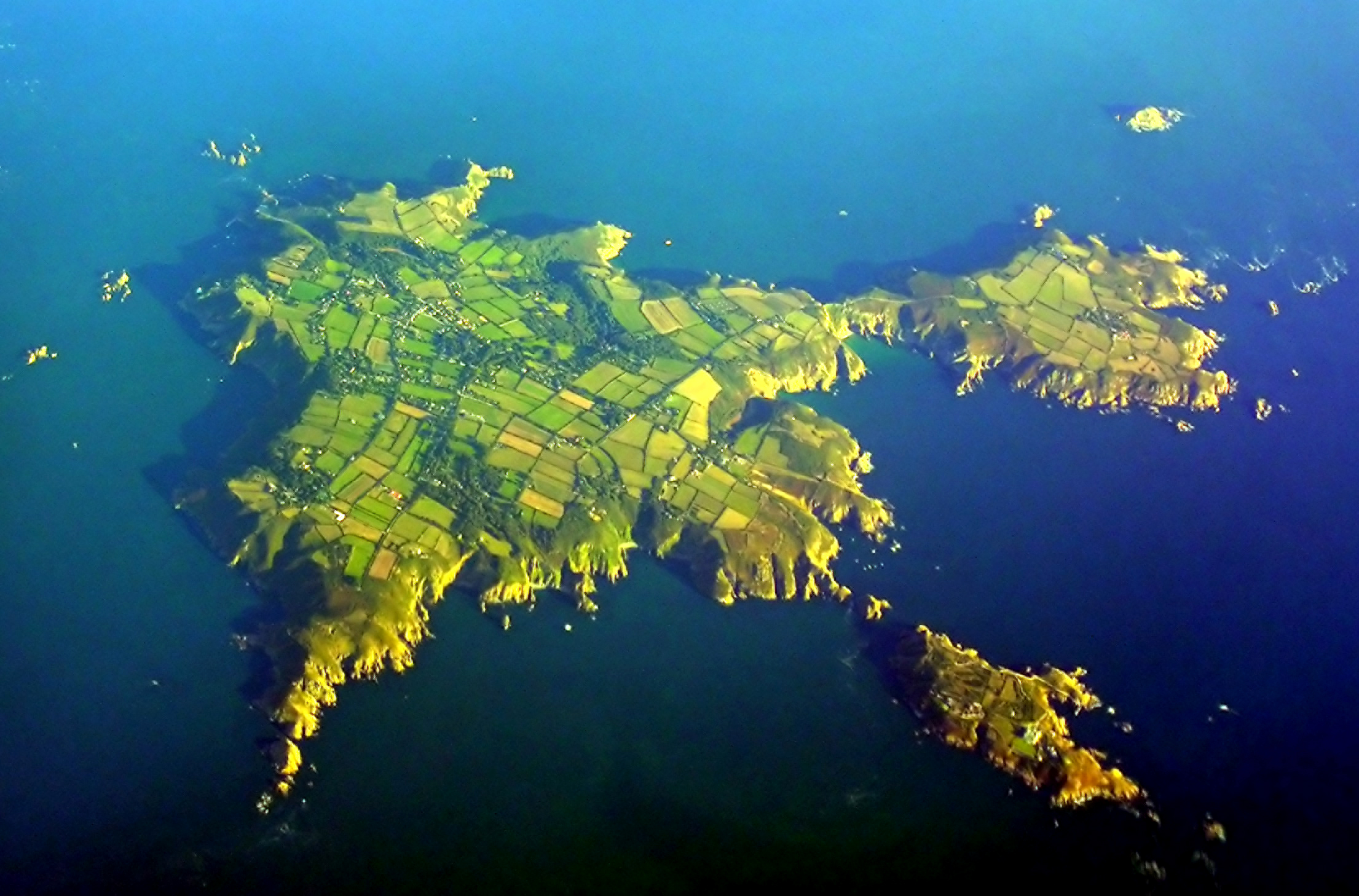
Aerial view of Sark

The island of Sark forms part of the Bailiwick of Guernsey which with the Bailiwick of Jersey form the Channel Islands. Offered the opportunity to evacuate the island in June 1940, most locally born islanders decided to stay. The 470 civilians who remained on the island would be subject to German rule for the next five years, until Sark was liberated on 10 May 1945. The main contact between the Sark residents and the German authorities in 1940 was 56-year old Sibyl Hathaway, who was Dame of Sark (feudal ruler) from 1927 until her death in 1974.

== Early war ==
Britain had declared war on Germany on 3 September 1939 and since then a number of islanders had left to volunteer for the armed services in England. A total of 27 people joined the armed services from Sark and one of those would be killed before the war ended.

Sark was prepared; 70 year-old John Perrio, armed with a rifle and dressed in a kilt, tunic and gumboots would ride his donkey "Clarabelle" around Brecqhou every day, according to a Fleet Street journalist, and somewhere on the island was a small supply of gunpowder for the old cannon on the cliff top.

In May 1940, with the fall of France imminent, the British Government suggested that there should be an evacuation of all who wished to leave.

Sibyl Hathaway, as Dame of Sark, had declared to a public meeting that she and her husband, Robert Hathaway, an American citizen and legally the co-ruler, would be staying on Sark and that she did not think the Germans would bother the island and even if they did, would not stay long. The islands could provide enough food, so there was no need to leave. This persuaded many people to stay, including most local born people. A number of English-born people did decide to go, some on ferries via Guernsey and some on private boats. One who left was the island's only doctor.

On 28 June Guernsey and Jersey were bombed, the Heinkel He 111s having flown low over Sark. They also machine gunned Sark fishing boats. German troops landed in Guernsey and Jersey a few days later with no fighting as the islands had been demilitarised and declared open towns.

=== Occupation ===
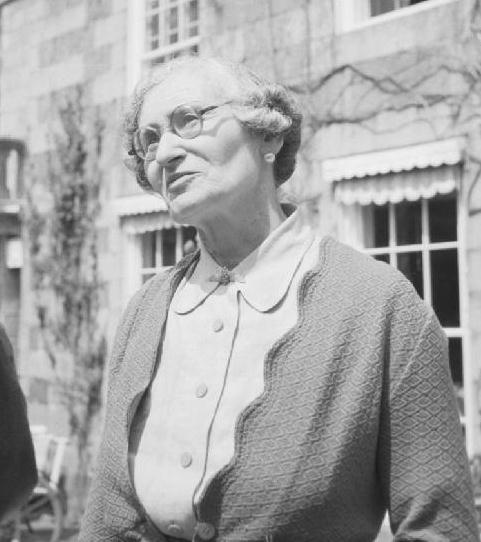
Sibyl Hathaway in 1945

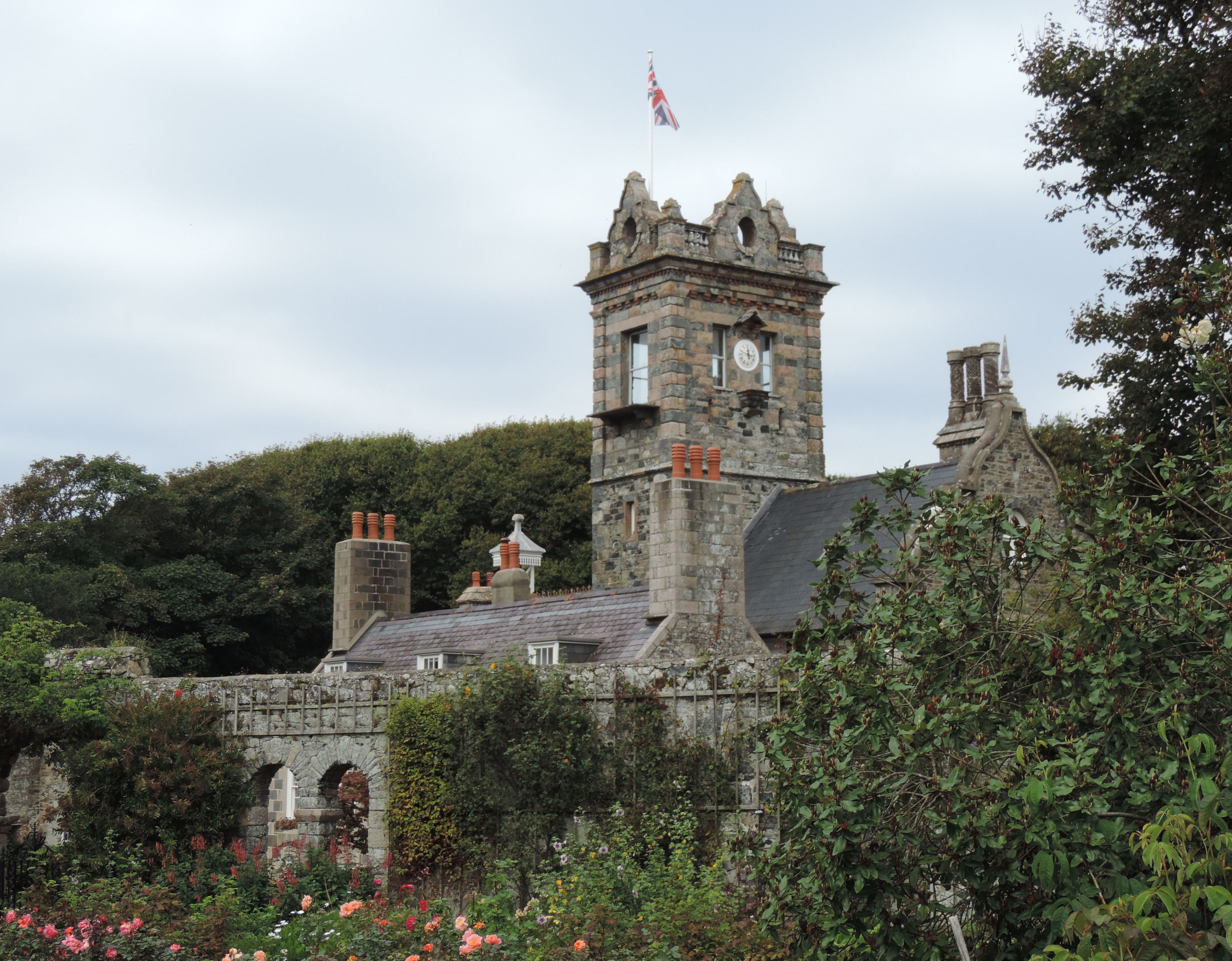
Seigneurie – Sark

The Guernsey lifeboat arrived on 3 July carrying three German officers. Major Doctor Albrecht Lanz, the commandant of Guernsey, was accompanied by Major Maass, who could speak English. They were told by the Seneschal that no carriage was available and they had to walk up the 300 feet (91 m) hill and across the Island to La Seigneurie, the home of Sibyl Hathaway, where she did them the honour of receiving them.

By playing on the etiquette of the old-school German officers, she would manage throughout the war to control meetings, expecting the officers to bow to her and kiss her hand; this was to be an advantage for the islanders. Sibyl Hathaway had worked in Germany and spoke German well, so could converse clearly with them. Also arriving on the lifeboat was a squad of 10 German troops under an NCO who established themselves, with a flag, in the Hotel Bel Air at the top of Harbour Hill.

One of Hathaway's early victories was to get agreement for a German doctor to be based in Sark who would treat the locals as well as the soldiers that would be based on the island.

On 8 July 1940, a British Commando raid, Operation Ambassador, was supposed to land troops in Guernsey. One party of No.11 Independent Company were taken to the wrong island (Sark) as a result of a faulty compass. Landing on Little Sark, the team explored La Sablonnerie and, not finding any Germans, returned safely to the destroyer.

=== Civilian life ===
As in the other islands, the German rules and regulations applied to Sark, including blackouts, curfews, opening hours of public houses, fishing, etc. but not the rules regarding motor cars. Sark, however, had no cars.

Fishing was an important business in Sark and permission was given to fish within 3 miles (4.8 km) and for two boats to travel to Guernsey to sell their catches and bring back petrol for the boats. Once a week the boats would call into Herm and Jethou to deliver supplies.

The German soft occupation attitude resulted in Sark people treating the small number of Germans more as tourists; soldiers would be invited to dinner and everyone met in the Mermaid Tavern. The Guernsey cricket team came to the island in 1940 for a local match. The Sark Sports games took place as normal. The Germans would behave in a very proper manner throughout the occupation.

The SS Staffa sailed from Guernsey to Sark three times weekly, carrying essentials including paraffin, coal and flour. She was later replaced by the MV Sheilla and then by the White Heather.

Sark, like all occupied countries, was obliged to pay for the occupation, which was difficult. Sark had no form of direct taxation on people or businesses, and the number of Germans in the island was increasing.

The confiscation of 180 radios in November 1940 did not affect the morale in Sark as much as elsewhere. Not many radios existed, many civilians spoke their local patois (Sercquiais), rather than English, and were not interested in the BBC. Even so, a few radios were kept back, as were crystal sets. The radios were returned on 14 December.

Christmas Eve was celebrated together, with decorations, music and carols sung by both groups. The Germans joined in the circle on New Year's Eve at midnight to sing "Auld Lang Syne", before firing their weapons to welcome the new year.

== Continuing occupation ==
=== 1941 ===
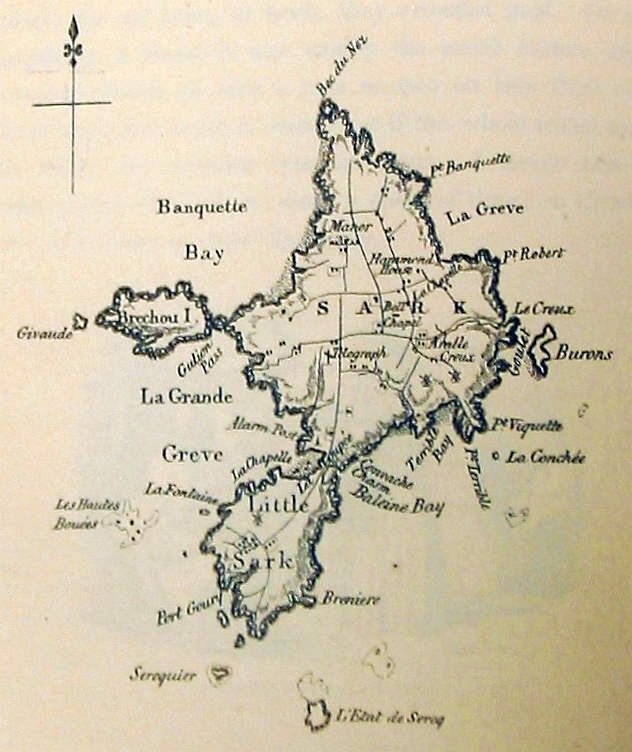
Sark – land area 5.45 square kilometres (2.10 square miles)

The soldiers were regularly rotated and additional soldiers arrived bringing the total to 200, including a group of high-handed bureaucrats. They issued orders that were both restrictive and illogical, such as limiting fishing times without consulting tide tables. The resulting was an appreciable fall in the fish catch. Later in the year they altered course and began listening to advice from Sibyl Hathaway before issuing even more orders, making restrictions milder in Sark than elsewhere.

Islanders found they could sometimes prevail in arguments with Germans over placement of barbed wire and machine gun positions, German soldiers fearing that Sibyl Hathaway might appeal to her “friend,” the commandant Colonel Rudolf Graf von Schmettow.

The first Red Cross messages arrived on 16 February 1941. A July message informed Sibyl Hathaway that her son had been killed in a bombing raid in Liverpool.

Shortages in shops became very noticeable and everyone concentrated on producing food. Islanders went hungry and began losing weight.

The year progressed with a fair amount of fraternisation, evenings in pubs and dances with local girls created a relaxed atmosphere. The Germans would play soccer against a Sark team. Sark was still open to tourists, be it now limited to just Guernsey holidaymakers. Identity cards were introduced in July.

The Channel Island “purchasing commission” based in Granville acquired what goods they could for Sark, based on their urgent shopping lists of essential supplies, what was available in France and the amount of cash they had been given.

German antisemitic orders only applied to one person on Sark, the Czech Jewish Annie Wranowsky. She became the German language teacher on Sark, avoided deportation, and continued with her job.

The Germans imported a few motor vehicles as well as draught horses as they began work on fortifying the island. Minefields were gradually established on beaches and cliff paths. Germans ordered anyone with a horse and cart to help transport military goods around the island. Brecqhou had been evacuated. A number of houses were demolished, or as they were of wooden construction, taken down and moved elsewhere.

=== 1942 ===
Visitors no longer arrived and the only excuse for a local to visit Guernsey was toothache, as Sark had no dentist. Fake toothache became common so people could spend a few days off island, maybe to visit a cinema.

German soldiers managed to set fire to their headquarters, the Hotel Bel Air, which was burnt to the ground. Headquarters changed to Le Manoir.

Radios, as in the other islands, were confiscated again, this time for the duration of the occupation.

In September a German order was issued to send all men of English parents to camps in Germany. Interpreted by Sibyl Hathaway to mean non-Sark born people, the initial list was reduced and ultimately only nine were sent to Guernsey. Single men were sent to Ilag VII in Laufen, Bavaria, joining many other deportees from the Channel Islands.

Another British commando raid, this one intending to land on Sark, Operation Basalt, comprising 12 men arrived on 3–4 October 1942 by MTB with the objective of capturing a prisoner. Landing on the east of the island they climbed the cliffs onto the 'Hogs Back' and followed a thin track towards the island's interior. The Commandos marked their route with luminous paint to aid their return. After looking at one empty house, traversing a valley and climbing to the other side they broke into another house. The lady there (Mrs Pittard, recent widow of the Sark doctor) directed them to the Dixcart Hotel, where after killing a sentry they forced entry and found five sleeping German military engineers. The small force took them prisoners and tied their hands, but the prisoners started shouting and then fighting. One German ran away towards the nearby Stock's Hotel where other garrison troops were sleeping. The struggle broke into fighting and the others were shot. Only one German was taken back to the MTB and the British escaped. Three German soldiers died. Mrs Pittard was sent to prison in Guernsey for three months. before being deported to Germany. The Sark commander, Oberleutnant Stefan Herdt lost his command for fraternisation and failure in the commando raid.

A few days after this event Hitler issued his Commando Order whereby Allied commandos would be treated like bandits and eliminated. The 1,376 POWs taken in the recent Dieppe Raid were handcuffed by the Germans, this was followed by handcuffing German POWs in Canada. Around 100 commandos who were captured in future raids in Europe were executed.

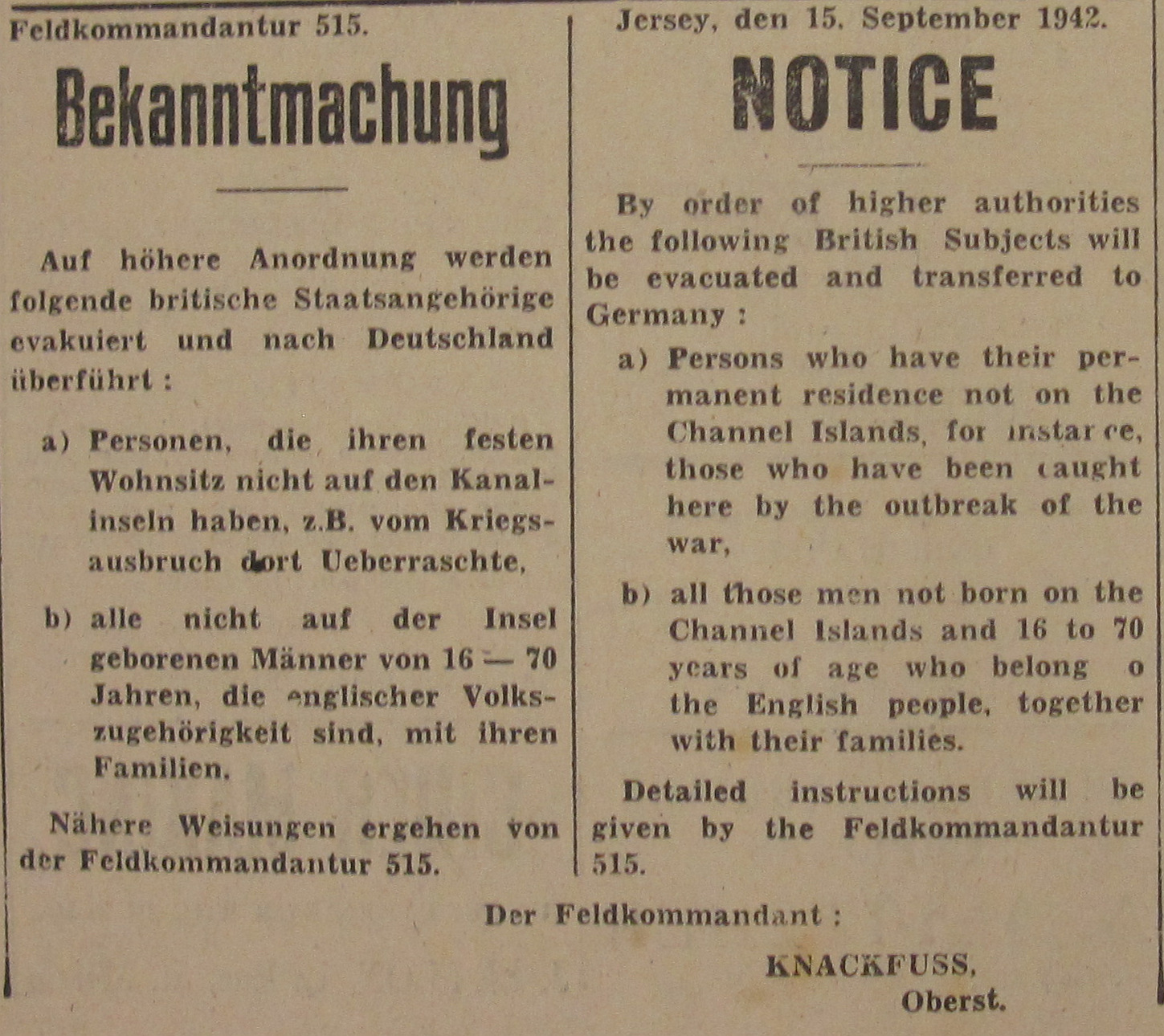
1942 deportation notice

Now that Sark was a front line in the war, Major Johann Hinkel, the new commander had 13,107 mines laid. Access to beaches was blocked and additional troops arrived taking the total to around 500. Anti aircraft guns and an anti tank gun were installed on the island. The 3.7 cm Pak 36 gun provided defence against shipping as did two 10.5 cm K 331(f) in field positions.

An Avro Lancaster bomber crashed at night near La Seigneurie on 23 November having run out of fuel. Some of the crew had bailed out over France. Three RAF men were captured and taken to Guernsey. Unlike in the other islands, islanders went outside to look if a plane was heard, as it seemed inconceivable that Sark would be bombed. Nobody had an air raid shelter or a gas mask.

=== 1943 ===
February brought a second batch of deportees, originally 60, it was reduced to 25 including the vicar, a family with seven children and a family with nine children and their elderly grandmother. The German commanders were not happy with the deportations, but the orders came directly from Hitler. Robert Hathaway the Seigneur of Sark, was amongst the deportees. Families went to Oflag V-B, located at Biberach an der Riß in countryside in southern Germany with a view of the Bavarian Alps.

The German commandant was killed in March when he stepped on a mine. Fifty minefields had been laid, including fields closely encircling the village. A four year old was also killed when she walked into a minefield.

With fishing the main source of food, one resident complained of having to eat lobster every day. There were 120 cattle so milk was sufficient for half a pint per person per day, farmers were also growing produce on 200 acres (81 hectares) and kept chickens and rabbits. All this and more was needed to feed the 400 islanders and the quota that went to the 500 soldiers. Most meat, apart from pork and rabbit had to come from Guernsey. In September the German garrison on Sark was reduced by 150.

Fuel was a problem, coal was unobtainable, trees are in short supply in Sark, dried seaweed could not be collected after the commando raid closed the beaches and collecting furze became impossible after the mines were laid. Germans began pulling down wooden houses for fuel. Electricity was not available except in a few houses and candles were unobtainable. Fishermen made a machine from Lancaster pieces to make rope which was unobtainable.

Just after Christmas 1943 saw a third British commando raid. Operation Hardtack was a series of commando raids in the Channel Islands. Hardtack 7 was a raid on Sark. The team failed to climb the cliffs on the first attempt and withdrew. Returning the next night they walked into a minefield; two were killed and most of the others were wounded but made their escape in canoes. The two dead men, thought by the Germans to be Canadians, when in fact they were Free French, Pte Andre Dignac and Cpl. R Bellamy, were buried in Sark.

== Late war ==
=== 1944 ===
The Guernsey Underground News Sheet (which went by the acronym Guns) published BBC news, illegally received, on a single news sheet from May 1942. The baker on Sark, Hubert Lanyon, would be sent three copies to pass on, however in February 1944 the Guernsey team was discovered and the baker was harshly interrogated by the Wehrmacht Feldgendarmerie until unconscious, but did not reveal his accomplices. He received a sentence of six months in prison, later reduced on appeal to four months. He survived, but two of the Guns team died in prison.

American planes carrying paratroopers passed 5,000 feet (1,500 m) over Sark on the night of 5-6 June 1944 as part of Operation Overlord. By 22 June Americans were on the French coast just 19 miles (31 km) away.

Three recovered 8.8 cm SK C/35 naval guns were emplaced in Little Sark as Batterie Klein-Sark for use in an anti-shipping role.

When Cherbourg and St Malo fell to the Americans, the islands were cut off and both civilian and German rations were reduced. In retaliation Sibyl Hathaway and a few helpers raided the German supply in the village hall and took away a ton of grain on a cart; the mill at La Seigneurie ground the grain into flour and it was distributed successfully.

At the very end of 1944 the Red Cross ship SS Vega arrived in Guernsey.

=== 1945 ===
In January a number of Red Cross parcels were shipped to Sark and distributed amongst the civilians. Sark would receive several additional Red Cross parcel deliveries before the war ended.

German soldiers now had less to eat than the civilians and were fainting in the streets and searching for plant roots they could boil. Mincing nettles made them easier to eat. Rabbits, cats and dogs continued to vanish.

When the news of Germany's unconditional surrender reached the island, Sibyl Hathaway hoisted the British and American flags and called the islanders together to listen to Churchill’s speech at 3pm on 8 May. The Germans locked themselves away in their barracks. A victory bonfire lit on the cliffs on Sark on 9 May caused concern in Guernsey, resulting in 10 British soldiers arriving on Sark on 10 May to formally accept the German surrender. Not having sufficient British troops available, Sibyl Hathaway was put in charge of the 270 German soldiers.

== Post war ==
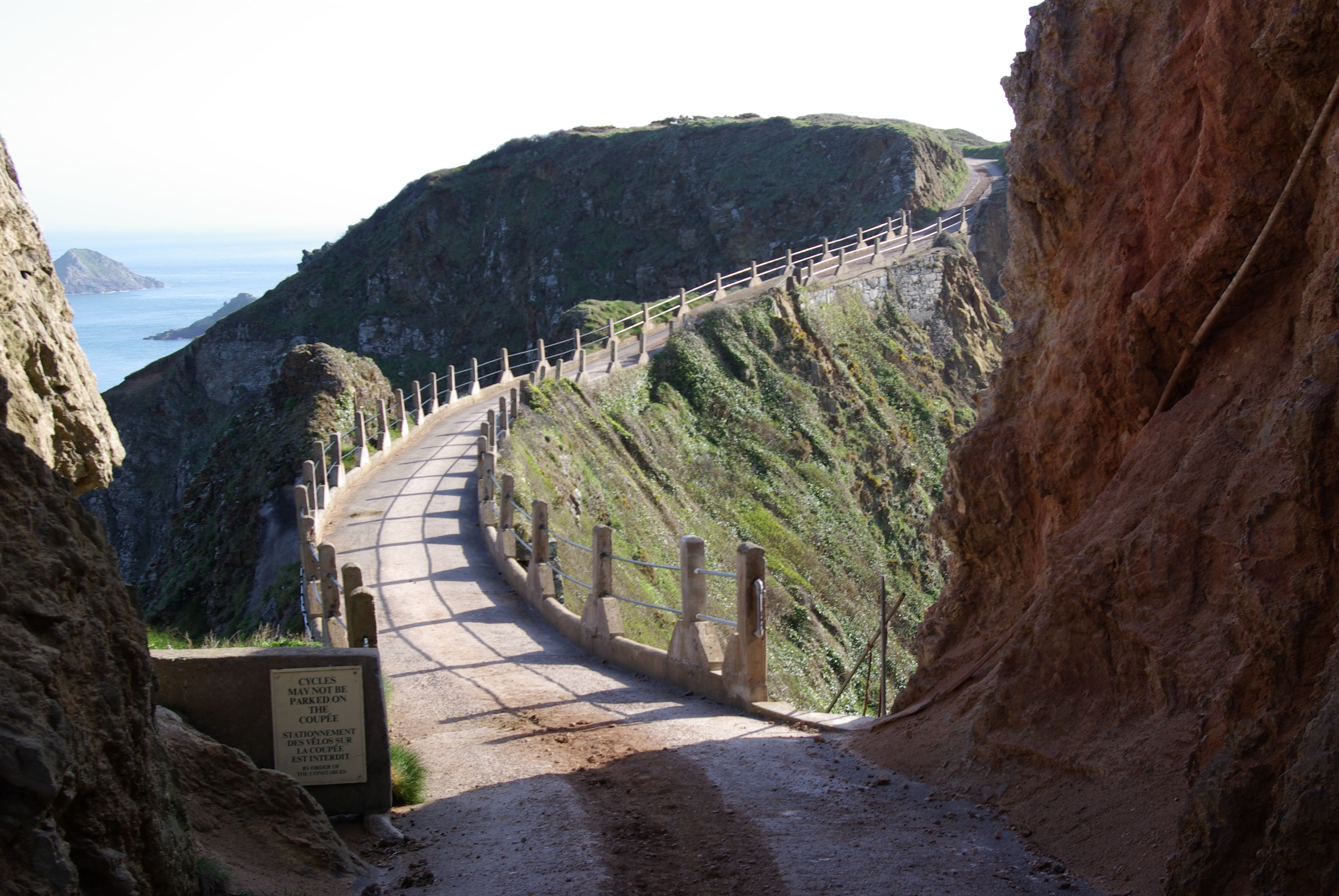
Sark Coupee

The Dame of Sark ordered the immediate lifting of mines; two Germans were killed from amongst the soldiers who were retained in Sark after the war to remove the mines. The soldiers also built the concrete road along the Coupee, which joins Little Sark to main Sark, under supervision by the Royal Engineers. The British brought a few motor vehicles over themselves before all vehicles were removed.

Many Sark residents had bitterly resented Sibyl Hathaway for the decision to remain on Sark during the ensuing five years of occupation, but thanked her after the war when they saw how total evacuation destroyed the way of life on the neighbouring island of Alderney. Sibyl Hathaway was much respected by the islanders as well as the Germans, for the leadership she gave during this period. The British Home Secretary Herbert Morrison observed that she remained "almost wholly mistress of the situation" throughout the occupation.

The deportees and service personnel returned to an island, which once cleared of mines and barbed wire, had changed little during the war. The islanders also seemed to have escaped most of the morale problems caused by separation, experienced by the larger islands as family units had stayed intact.

Later than other Channel Island leaders during the war, the Dame of Sark, Sibyl Hathaway was honoured by being made an Ordinary Officer of the Civil Division of the Order of the British Empire in June 1949, days before a visit by Princess Elizabeth to Sark. In 1965, on the 400th anniversary of Queen Elizabeth I's grant of charter signed in 1565, she was made Dame Commander of the Order of the British Empire.

== See also ==
- Channel Islands Occupation Society
- German occupation of the Channel Islands
- Deportations from the German-occupied Channel Islands
- Civilian life under the German occupation of the Channel Islands
