= Appointment with Venus =

1951 novel by Jerrard Tickell

- First edition
- Author: Jerrard Tickell
- Language: English
- Genre: War novel
- Publisher: Hodder & Stoughton
- Publication date: 1951
- Publication place: United Kingdom
- Media type: Print (Hardback & Paperback)

Appointment with Venus (LCCN 51-39007) is a novel by Jerrard Tickell published by Hodder & Stoughton in 1951, leading to a British film adaptation the same year and a Danish film adaptation in 1962. The story is based on a real incident of the evacuation of Alderney cattle from the Channel Island during World War II.

== Plot summary ==
In 1940, after the fall of France, the fictitious Channel Island of Armorel is occupied by a small garrison of German troops under the benign command of Hauptmann Weiss. He finds that the hereditary ruler, the Suzerain, is away in the army, leaving the Provost in charge.

Back in London, the Ministry of Agriculture realise that Venus, a valuable pedigree Guernsey cow, remains on the island. They petition the War Office to mount a rescue operation, and Major Valentine Morland is assigned the mission, with the assistance of the Suzerain's sister Nicola Fallaize who joined the A.T.S. at the outbreak of war.

They travel to Armorel by submarine, contact the Provost and other friends on the island, and discover that Weiss, a cattle breeder in civilian life, is about to have the cow shipped to Germany. Nicola persuades her artist cousin, who has tried to ignore the war, to help by painting another cow with Venus' distinctive markings, and, with some narrow escapes, they succeed in taking Venus to a waiting ship for the journey back to England.

== Production ==
- The island of Armorel appears to be a fictionalised version of Sark. Sark was used as a location when making the film adaptation.
- Before their mission, Morland takes Fallaise out to dinner, and after their main courses, he asks the waiter for "coffee and kimmel", the latter being a liqueur said to be especially popular at golf clubs.

== Other adaptations ==
BBC World Service broadcast a 4-part dramatisation by Michael Bartlett featuring Karen Archer and Michael Cochrane in 1992.

A 1993 audio cassette version of the novel was produced by Soundings Ltd (ISBN 185496822X).

== See also ==
- Appointment with Venus (1951 British film adaptation)
- Venus fra Vestø (1962 Danish film adaptation)
- Laura Secord and her cow during the War of 1812
