= Herdt =

Herdt is a surname. Notable people with the surname include:

- Gilbert Herdt (born 1949), American anthropologist
- James L. Herdt (born 1947), United States Navy officer
- Stefan Herdt (born 1915), German politician
- Waldemar Herdt (born 1962), German politician

== See also ==
- Gerdt
