= Appointment with Venus (film) =

1951 British film by Ralph Thomas

- Theatrical release poster
- Directed by: Ralph Thomas
- Written by: Nicholas Phipps
- Based on: Appointment with Venus by Jerrard Tickell
- Produced by: Betty Box; Peter Rogers (associate)
- Starring: David Niven; Glynis Johns; George Coulouris; Barry Jones; Kenneth More
- Cinematography: Ernest Steward
- Edited by: Gerald Thomas
- Music by: Benjamin Frankel
- Production company: British Film Makers Ltd
- Distributed by: General Film Distributors (UK); Universal (US)
- Release dates: 8 October 1951; (UK); 30 June 1952 (US)
- Running time: 90 minutes
- Country: United Kingdom
- Language: English
- Box office: £144,000

Appointment with Venus is a 1951 British war drama film, a film adaptation of the 1951 Jerrard Tickell novel of the same name. It was directed by Ralph Thomas, produced by Betty E. Box and its screenplay was written by the novelist Nicholas Phipps. The film was based on the evacuation of Alderney cattle from the Channel Island during World War II.

In the United States, the film was re-titled Island Rescue.

== Plot ==
In 1940, after the fall of France, the fictitious Channel Island of Armorel is occupied by a small garrison of German troops under the benign command of Hauptmann Weiss. The hereditary ruler, the Suzerain, is away in the British Army, leaving the Provost in charge.

Back in London, the Ministry of Agriculture realise that during the evacuation of the island, Venus, a prize pedigree pregnant cow, was left behind. They petition the War Office to do something urgently due to the value of the cow's bloodline, and Major Morland is assigned the task of rescuing Venus. The Suzerain's sister, Nicola Fallaize, is in Wales, serving as an Auxiliary Territorial Service army cook. She is quickly posted to the War Office so she can tell them about the island. However, when Morland finds out that Venus is practically a member of her family, he obtains permission to ask her to go along. They, radio operator Sergeant Forbes and naval officer "Trawler" Langley, who knows the local waters, are taken to the island by submarine.

They contact the Provost and discover that Weiss, a cattle breeder in civilian life, is about to have the cow shipped to Germany. Nicola persuades her pacifist cousin and painter Lionel Fallaize to disguise another cow as Venus, so they can switch them. Weiss detects the deception, and the chase is on. They are captured by Sergeant Vogel, but manage to overpower him (after Venus gives birth). They spirit the cow and her calf onto a Royal Navy Motor Torpedo Boat which takes them to Britain, sinking a pursuing German E-boat in the process.

== Cast ==
- David Niven as Major Valentine Morland
- Glynis Johns as Volunteer Nicola Fallaize
- George Coulouris as Captain Weiss
- Barry Jones as the Provost
- Kenneth More as Lionel Fallaize
- Noel Purcell as "Trawler" Langley
- Bernard Lee as Brigadier
- Jeremy Spenser as Georges
- Martin Boddey as Sergeant Vogel
- Patric Doonan as Sergeant Forbes
- John Horsley as Naval Officer Kent
- George Benson as Senior clerk
- Richard Wattis as Carruthers
- David Horne as Magistrate
- Philip Stainton as Constable
- Pat Nye as ATS auxiliary
- Nicholas Phipps as Minister
- Derek Blomfield as Admiralty Officer

== Production ==
The story is based on a real incident told to Tickell after the war by an army officer who had been involved. The film follows the original novel closely, with the exception of the fate of Lionel.

The film was made under a new funding model for Rank, British Film Makers, where movies were co financed by the NFFC.

The film was shot in April 1951 at Pinewood Studios, and on location on the island of Sark. Sark, inhabited by 500 people, had a feudal ruler, the Seigneur, until 2008, as depicted in the play The Dame of Sark. Like all the other Channel Islands, it was occupied by German troops 1940–1945. British commandos made two unsuccessful raids in 1942–43.

The island did not allow motorised traffic. The filmmakers were allowed one Land Rover and trailer to transport their equipment; otherwise, they had to walk or use boats and horse-drawn carriages. The rushes were transported to the nearby island of Guernsey, where they were seen weekly.

Kenneth More's casting meant he had to turn down a role in Angels One Five. More says he had a key scene where his character turns from pacifist to resistance fighter by knocking out a German; he was preparing to shoot it when Ralph Thomas told him that the scene had to go to David Niven, as the star. Although Niven and More got along well, according to More's wife Billie, director Ralph Thomas told More, "I'm afraid David has been watching too many rushes and you're coming over too well."

Thomas later said they used twelve plain coloured cows to play the lead cow, painting them with a patch on the side. He said this "was a sod because we shot mainly on location, and every time it rained, which it did regularly, the colours would run, and you would think the cow was milking itself because drops of paint were falling on the grass. It was a difficult picture but it was fun."

== Reception ==
=== Box office ===
The film was a success at the British box office, earning billings of £144,000 and its commercial performance was recorded as "good". It was judged by Kinematograph Weekly as a "notable performer" at British cinemas in 1951.

=== Critical ===
The Daily Telegraph called the film "a trifle, but the characters are conventionally attractive, the scenery is lovely, the dialogue is brightish." Filmink called it "charming".

== See also ==
- Venus fra Vestø, remake about the rescue of a Danish cow named Venus
- Cow (2009 film)
