= Channel Island cattle =

Breeds of cattle found on the Channel Islands between England and France

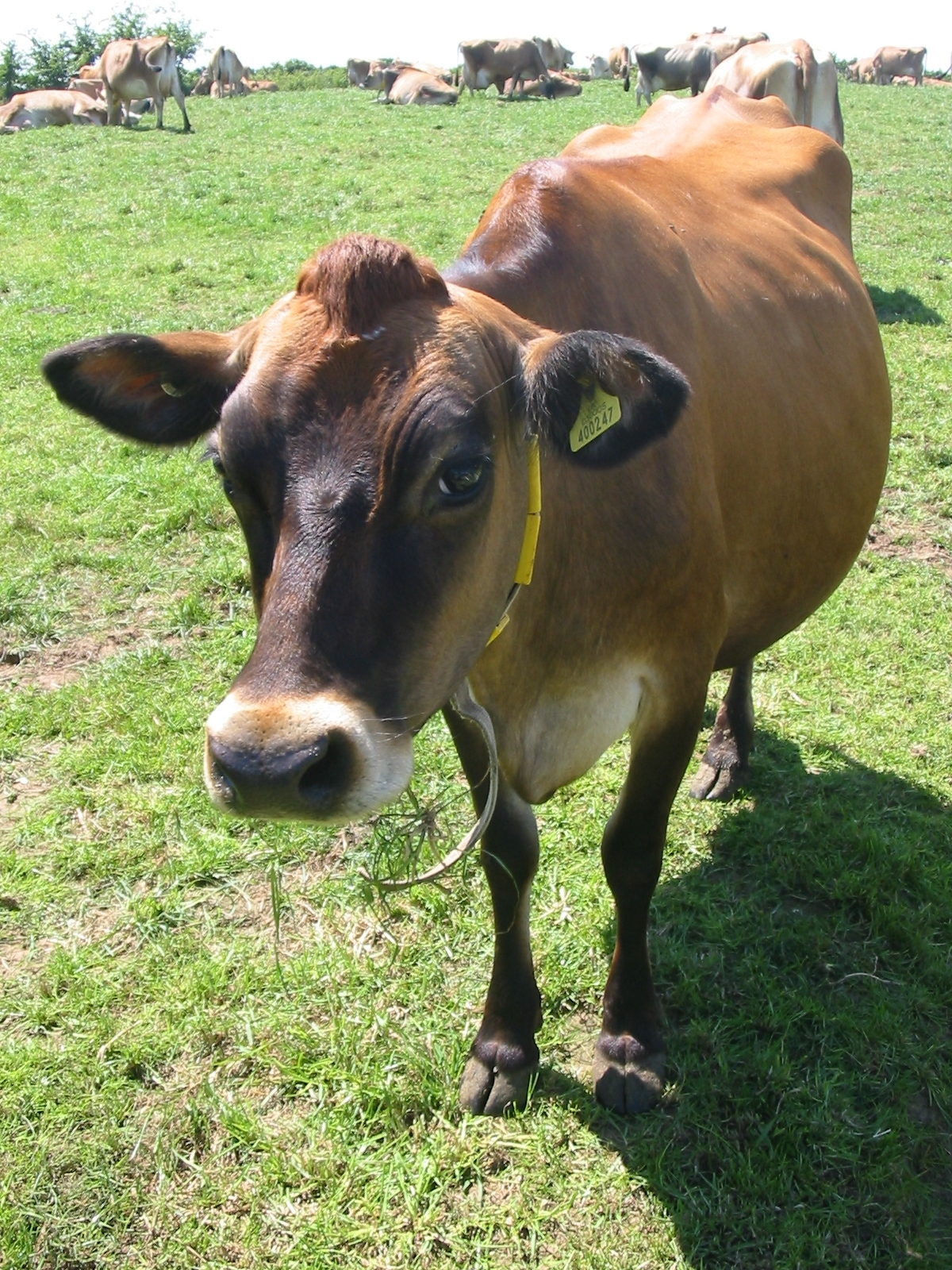
Jersey cattle in Jersey

Channel Island cattle is a collective name for the breeds of cattle developed in the Channel Islands located between England and France. The breeds which can be so described are the Jersey, the Guernsey and the Alderney.

== See also ==
- Channel Island milk
