= Jerrard Tickell =

Irish writer (1905–1966)

Edward Jerrard Tickell (14 February 1905 – 27 March 1966) was an Irish writer, known for his novels and historical books on the Second World War.

== Biography ==
Jerrard Tickell was born in Dublin and educated in Tipperary and, from 1919 until 1922, at Highgate School in London. He joined the Royal Army Service Corps in 1940 and was commissioned in 1941, when he was appointed to the War Office. Between 1943 and 1945 his official duties took him to Africa, the Middle East, Washington DC, Canada, the West Indies and Europe. He was appointed to the General Staff in 1945.

He was married to the author and psychical researcher Renée Haynes, the daughter of the eminent English social moralist E. S. P. Haynes and Oriana Huxley Waller (a granddaughter of Thomas Henry Huxley) and they had three sons: Crispin, Patrick, and Tom.

Tickell wrote 21 novels, including the bestselling Appointment with Venus (1951), which was made into a film of the same name starring David Niven and a 1962 Danish film Venus fra Vestø.

His non-fiction work includes a memoir of SOE agent Odette Hallowes, an account of No. 138 Squadron RAF (Moon Squadron), and a history of "Ascalon", Winston Churchill's personal Avro York transport aircraft.

=== Scandal ===
A book, The West End Front (published in 2011) by Matthew Sweet, gives details of a forgotten incident in London during WW2 which resulted in Tickell facing trial at the Old Bailey on a charge of murder by criminal abortion, of which he was acquitted. Sweet recounts how he broke the news of this rediscovered chapter of family history to Tickell's two surviving sons, Crispin, former British Permanent Representative on the UN Security Council, and Tom, former Guardian newspaper columnist.

== Publications ==
=== Non-fiction ===
- Odette: The Story of a British Agent (1949)
- Moon Squadron (1956)
- Ascalon: The Story of Sir Winston Churchill's Wartime Flights from 1943 to 1945 (1964)
- Wings on My Suitcase - Personal Adventures of Air Hostesses (1958). Introduced and edited by Jerrard Tickell.

=== Fiction ===
- Yolan of the Plains (1928)
- See How They Run (1936)
- Fly Away Blackbird (1936)
- Silk Purse (1937)
- Jill Fell Down (1938)
- Gentlewomen Aim to Please (1938)
- At Dusk All Cats Are Grey (1940)
- Soldier from the Wars Returning (1942)
- Appointment with Venus (1951)
- The Hand and Flower (1952)
- Dark Adventure (1952)
- The Dart Players (1953)
- The Hero of Saint Roger (1954)
- Miss May: The Story of an Englishwoman (1958)
- Whither Do You Wander? (1959)
- The Hunt for Richard Thorpe (1960)
- Villa Mimosa (1960)
- Hussar Honeymoon (1963)
- High Water at Four (1965)

== See also ==
- Huxley family
