= Gerdts =

Gerdts is a surname. Notable people with the surname include:

- Donna Gerdts, Canadian linguist
- Mac Gerdts, German board game designer
- Michael Gerdts (born 1947), German diplomat
- William H. Gerdts (1929–2020), American art historian

== See also ==
- Gerdt
