= South Devon (disambiguation) =

South Devon is the southern part of the county of Devon in England.

South Devon may also refer to

- South Devon Area of Outstanding Natural Beauty
- South Devon (constituency)
- South Devon College
- South Devon cattle, a breed of cattle
