= Devon cattle (disambiguation) =

Devon cattle, or North Devon cattle, is a traditional British breed of cattle.

Devon cattle may also refer to:

- South Devon cattle, a British breed of cattle
- American Milking Devon, an American breed of cattle
