= Venus fra Vestø =

1962 film

- Film poster
- Directed by: Annelise Reenberg
- Written by: Børge Müller; Jerrard Tickell
- Produced by: Poul Bang
- Starring: Malene Schwartz
- Cinematography: Rudolf Frederiksen; Ole Lytken
- Edited by: Wera Iwanouw; Lizzi Weischenfeldt
- Music by: Sven Gyldmark
- Production company: Saga Studios
- Distributed by: ASA Film
- Release date: 21 December 1962
- Running time: 116 minutes
- Country: Denmark
- Language: Danish

Venus fra Vestø (literally, Venus from West Island) is a 1962 Danish comedy war film directed by Annelise Reenberg and starring Malene Schwartz. The film is based on Jerrard Tickell's 1951 novel Appointment with Venus (Danish title: Operation Venus), but re-set on a Danish island rather than a fictional island in the Channel Islands archipelago.

== Cast ==
- Malene Schwartz as Miss Nicola Egede-Schack
- Henning Moritzen as John Morland
- Dirch Passer as Ditlev Egede-Schack
- William Knoblauch as Parish Council Chairman (Note: Sognerådsformand) Ole Klausen
- Ole Wegener as Radio Telegraphist Henriksen
- Jan Priiskorn-Schmidt as Søren Severinsen
- Arthur Jensen as Pive Ras
- Holger Hansen as Morten Jacobsen (Note: 'Trawler Jack' in the original novel)
- Gunnar Lemvigh as Kromand
- Jakob Nielsen as Kristoffer
- Jerrard Tickell as Uncle George
- Poul Thomsen as Courtroom Interpreter
- Karl Heinz Neumann as Captain Weiss
- Inger Knoblauch
- Edith Hermansen
- Avi Sagild as Mathilde
- Varinka Wichfeld Muus
- Flemming B. Muus
- Vera Lynn as Herself
- Richard Wattis, Edward Chapman, Allan Blanner and David Collet as Englishmen

== See also ==
- Appointment with Venus (1951)
