= Channel Island milk =

Type of milk from Jersey or Guernsey breed of cows

Channel Island milk is a creamy, light-beige coloured cow's milk from the Jersey cattle and Guernsey cattle breeds. This variety of milk is commonly called Jersey milk and is also known as gold-top milk from the colour of the bottle cap often used to distinguish it in the UK market. Channel Island milk is produced in the Channel Islands off the northwestern French coast of Normandy, as well as in the United Kingdom, Australia, South Africa, Denmark, the United States and Canada.

Channel Island milk has a 39% higher fat (5.4 per cent) and 19% higher protein (3.9 per cent) content than whole milk produced by Holstein Friesian cattle (3.9 per cent and 3.3 per cent respectively), and also contains higher levels of calcium, vitamin A and vitamin D than other types of milk. Milk from Guernsey cows is notable for the levels of beta-carotene, Omega-3 fatty acid and A2 β-casein protein.

The Guernsey and Jersey dairies each have a monopoly on milk supplies on their respective islands, and both distribute a range of full fat, semi-skimmed and skimmed milk from the local pedigree herds. In the UK, Channel Island milk and dairy products are often targeted at the premium end of the market; the UK retail market for Channel Island milk products is more limited than that in Canada and Denmark, where a wider array of yoghurts, cheeses, cream cheeses and ice creams made from Channel Island milk, in full fat and low fat forms, are sometimes available.
