= Jersey cattle =

British breed of small dairy cattle

Jersey
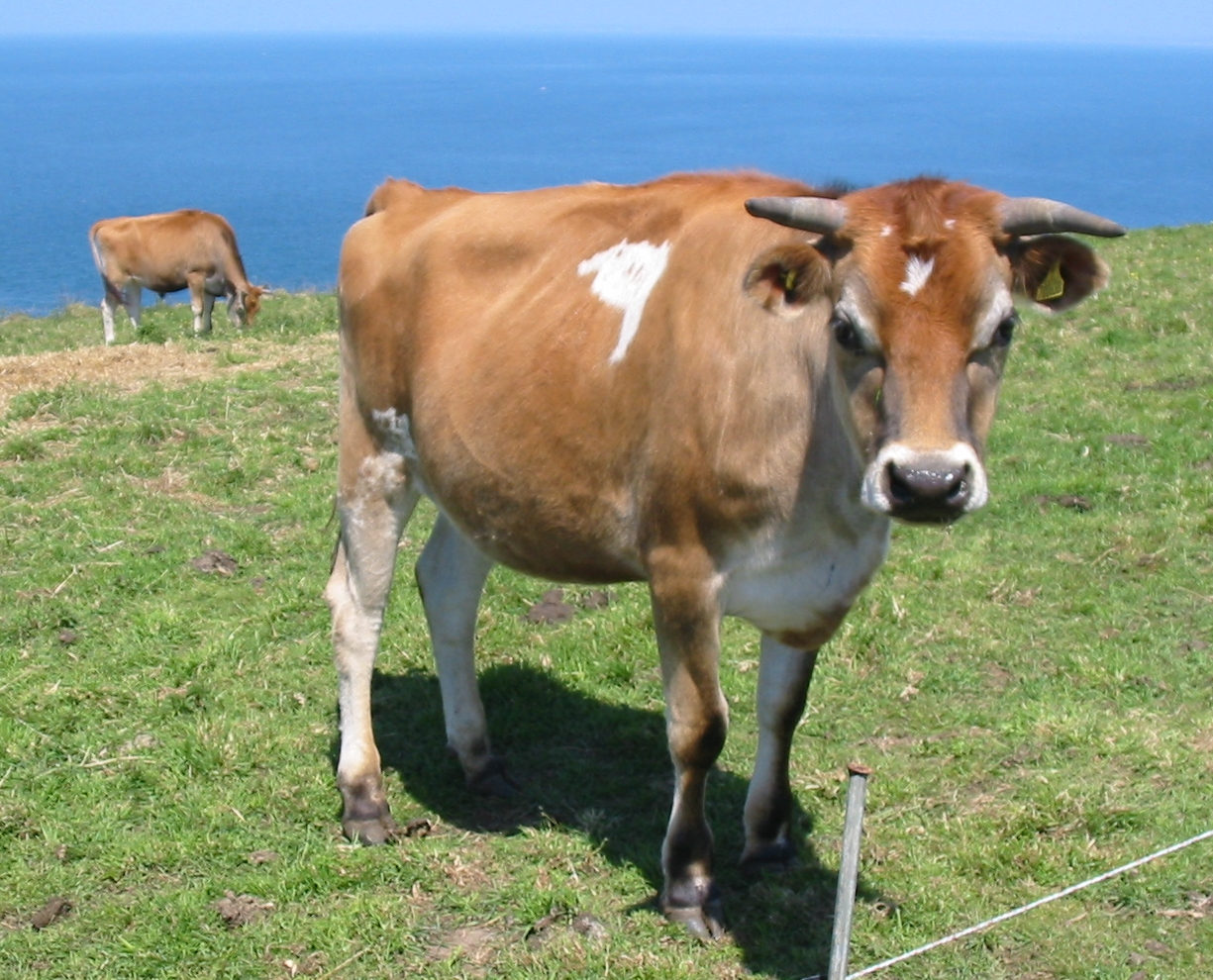
- Bullocks in Trinity, Jersey
- Country of origin: Jersey, Channel Islands
- Distribution: world-wide
- Use: dairy; draught

Traits
- Weight: Male: 600–700 kg (1300–1500 lb); Female: 350–400 kg (800–900 lb)
- Height: Female: 115–120 cm (45–47 in)
- Coat: variable
- Cattle; Bos (primigenius) taurus

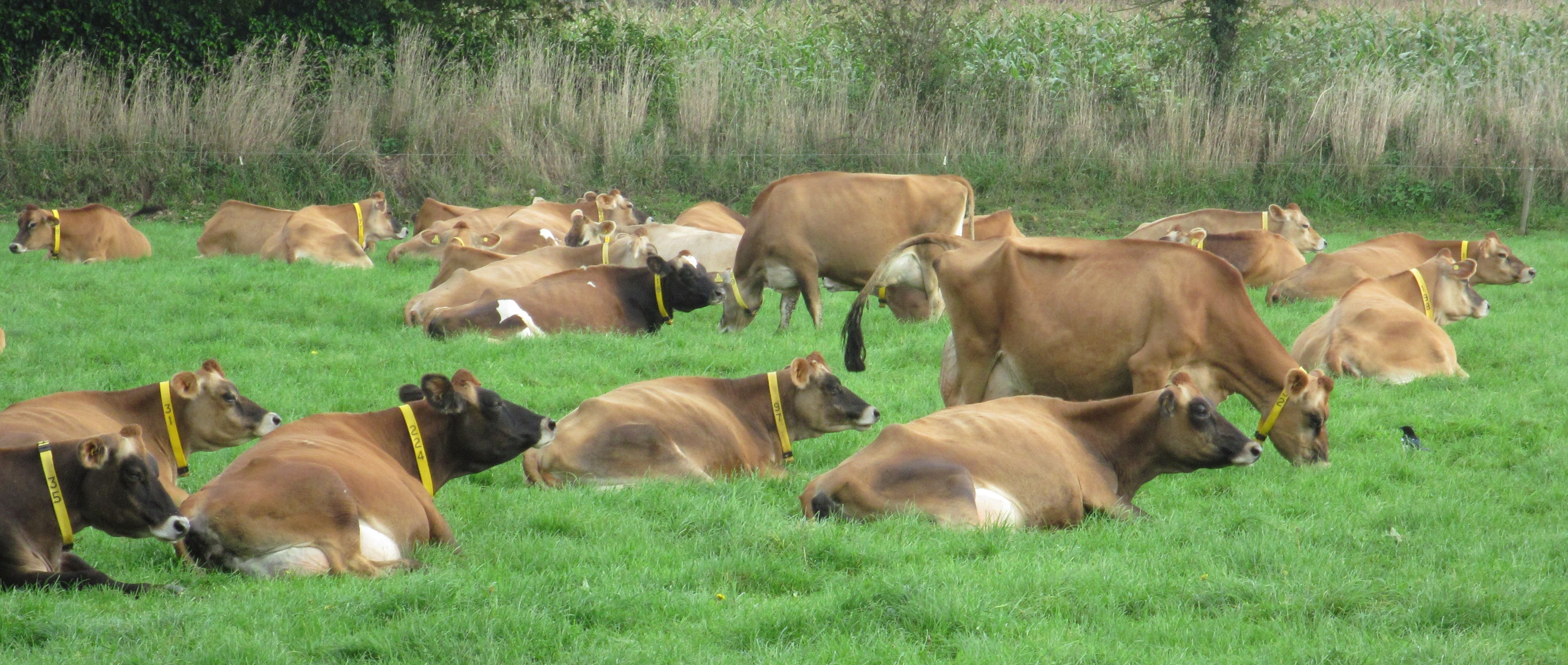
Herd of cows at Saint Saûveux

The Jersey is a British breed of small dairy cattle from Jersey, in the British Channel Islands. It is one of three Channel Island cattle breeds, the others being the Alderney – now extinct – and the Guernsey. The milk is high in butterfat and has a characteristic yellowish tinge.

The Jersey adapts well to various climates and environments, and unlike many breeds originating in temperate climates, tolerates heat well. It has been exported to many countries of the world; in some of them, including Denmark, France, New Zealand and the United States, it has developed into an independent breed. In Nepal, it is used as a draught animal.

== History of the breed ==
As its name implies, the Jersey was bred on the British Channel Island of Jersey. It apparently descended from cattle stock brought over from the nearby Norman mainland, and was first recorded as a separate breed around 1700.

The breed was isolated from outside influence for over 200 years, with a ban from 1789 to 2008. Farmers Weekly stated the ban began in 1763 until 2008 or 245 years.

Before 1789, cows would be given as dowry for inter-island marriages between Jersey and Guernsey. This was, however, not widespread.

In 1789, imports of foreign cattle into Jersey were forbidden by law to maintain the purity of the breed, although exports of cattle and semen have been important economic resources for the island. The restriction on the import of cattle was initially introduced to prevent a collapse in the export price. The United Kingdom levied no import duty on cattle imported from Jersey. Cattle were being shipped from France to Jersey and then shipped onward to England to circumvent the tariff on French cattle. The increase in the supply of cattle, sometimes of inferior quality, was bringing the price down and damaging the reputation of Jersey cattle. The import ban stabilised the price and enabled a more scientifically controlled programme of breeding to be undertaken.

Sir John Le Couteur studied selective breeding and became a Fellow of the Royal Society; his work led to the establishment of the Royal Jersey Agricultural and Horticultural Society in 1833. At that time, the breed displayed greater variation than it does today, with white, dark brown, and mulberry beasts. However, since the honey-brown cows sold best, the breed was developed accordingly. In 1860, 1138 cows were exported via England, the average price being £16 per head. By 1910, over 1000 head were exported annually to the United States alone.

In 1866, at the annual general meeting of the Royal Jersey Agricultural and Horticultural Society, H.G. Shepard noted in his history that "it was resolved – on the motion of Col. Le Couteur, that the Hon. Secretary be hereby invited to open and to carry on a "herd book" in which the pedigree of bulls, cows, and heifers shall be entered for reference to all the members of the Society." In 1869 for the first time, prizes were awarded at the society's shows for herd book stock cattle.

The States of Jersey took a census of stock in 1866, and Jersey then supported 12037 head of cattle, of which 611 were bulls.

In July 2008 the States of Jersey took the historic step of ending the ban on imports, and allowing the import of bull semen from any breed of cattle, although only semen that is genetically pure enables the resultant progeny to be entered in the Jersey Herd Book. For many decades, each of the 12 parishes in Jersey held cattle shows in the spring, summer, and autumn, followed in turn by the main shows held by the Royal Jersey Agricultural and Horticultural Society, where the best of the parish shows competed. The colour of the rosette secured by a prize-winning cow was said to determine its export value. Today, the RJAHS holds two shows a year, where usually five or six of the remaining 23 herds compete against each other for the top prizes. A Jersey cattle show is also held in Jersey, by the West Show Association.

In February 2010, semen from an impure breed Jersey bull had been imported into the island despite strict laws and checks, and 100 cows had been impregnated with the semen. Their offspring was not recorded in the Jersey Herd Book.

Jersey cattle were exported to the United States from about 1850. A breed society, the American Jersey Cattle Club, was formed in 1868. In the USA, a distinction is sometimes made between the "American Jersey", which is comparatively coarse and large and has been selectively bred mainly for milk yield, and the original or "Island" type; the latter may also be called "Miniature Jersey".

== Characteristics ==
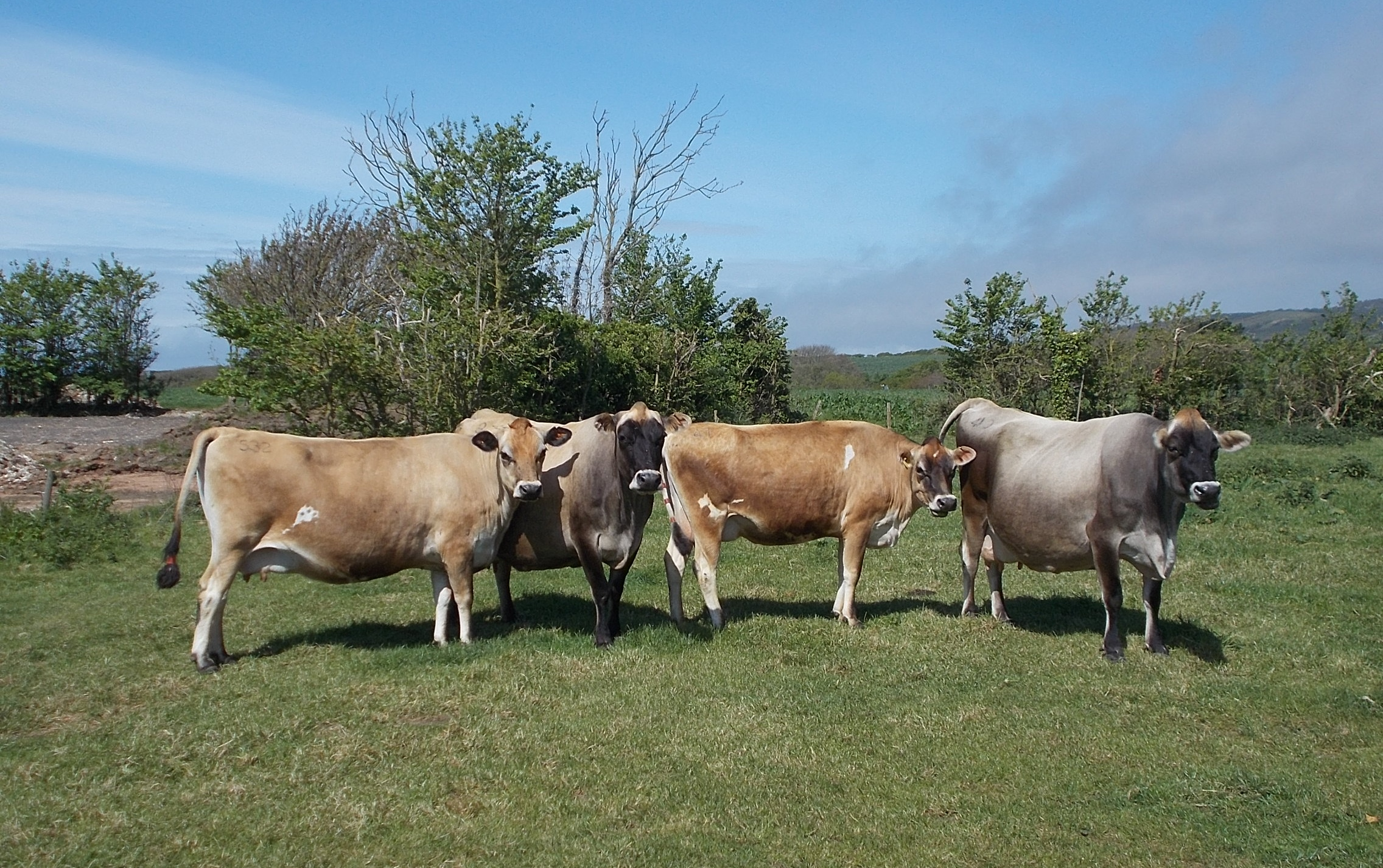
Jersey cows near Brighstone, on the Isle of Wight

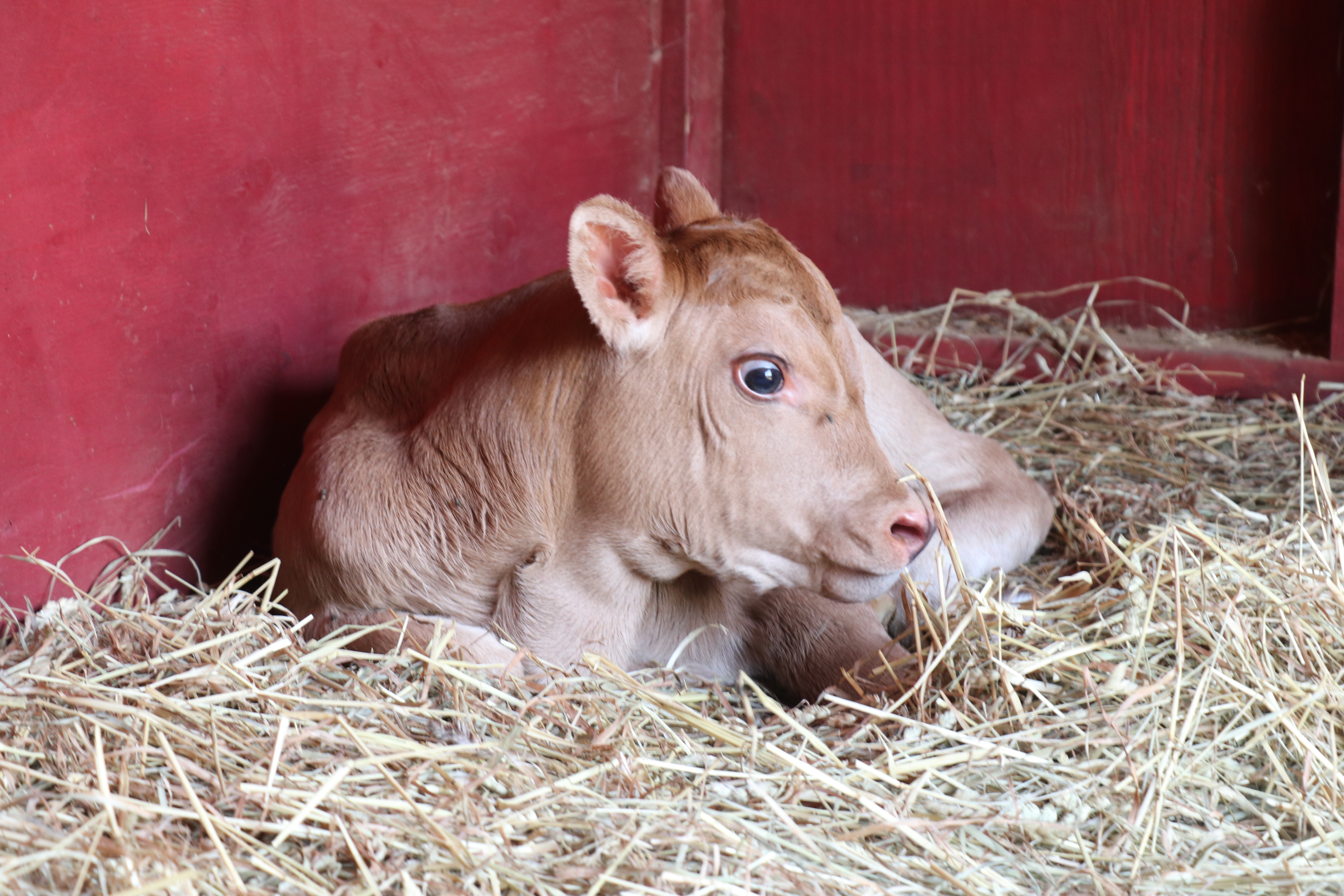
Calf in a barn in Cutchogue, New York

The Jersey is small. Cows in the island weigh some 350–400 kg and stand about 115–120 cm at the withers; bulls weigh some 600–700 kg. Factors contributing to the popularity of the breed have been their greater economy of production, due to:

- The ability to carry a larger number of effective milking cows per unit area due to lower body weight, hence lower maintenance requirements, and superior grazing ability
- Calving ease and a relatively lower rate of dystocia, leading to their popularity in crossbreeding with other dairy and even beef breeds to reduce calving related injuries
- High fertility
- High butterfat (4.84%) and protein (3.95%), and the ability to thrive on locally produced feed

Jerseys occur in all shades of brown, from light tan to almost black. They are frequently fawn in colour. All purebred Jerseys have a lighter band around their muzzles, a dark switch (long hair on the end of the tail), and black hooves, although in recent years, colour regulations have been relaxed to allow a broadening of the gene pool.

The cows are calm and docile; bulls may be unpredictable or aggressive.

Jersey cattle have a greater tendency towards postparturient hypocalcaemia (or "milk fever") in dams, and tend to have frail calves that require more attentive management in cold weather than other dairy breeds due to their smaller body size (which results in an increased surface area-to-mass ratio, increasing heat loss).

== Milk ==
After 2008, there was some pressure for Jersey dairymen to attempt to increase the milk production per cow. This led to possibly securing options from outside the island.

From 2020 onward there was a further challenge with COVID-19 while seeking the "maximum productivity and business efficiencies". Jersey milk has 20% more calcium, 18% more protein, and 29% more milk fat than Holstein.
