= Renée Haynes =

British writer and researcher (1906–1992)

- Born: July 23, 1906; London, England
- Died: October 12, 1992 (aged 86)
- Education: St Hugh's College, Oxford
- Occupations: Writer, historian, psychical researcher
- Employer: British Council
- Organization: Society for Psychical Research
- Spouse: Jerrard Tickell (m. 1929; died 1966)
- Relatives: E. S. P. Haynes (father); Thomas Henry Huxley (great grandfather); Crispin Tickell (son)

Renée Oriana Haynes (23 July 1906 – 12 October 1992) was an English writer, historian, and psychical researcher. She was the author of an influential novel about her experience of Oxford University during the 1920s, and later coined the parapsychology term "boggle-threshold", to indicate the point at which tolerance of a claim turns to disbelief.

== Personal life ==
Renée Oriana Haynes was born in London on 23 July 1906, the eldest daughter of lawyer and writer E. S. P. Haynes. Her mother was the granddaughter of Thomas Henry Huxley. Growing up, her parents' friends included Julian Huxley, Aldous Huxley, C. K. Scott Moncrieff, G. K. Chesterton, and Hilaire Belloc (whose biography Haynes wrote in 1953).

Haynes was educated at private schools, including an experimental day-school run by Theosophists. She then studied law and history at St Hugh’s College, Oxford, graduating in 1927. While there, Haynes was editor of the college's magazine, The Fritillary. The Times suggested that her novel written about her time at Oxford, Neapolitan Ice (1928), "was probably the first by a woman undergraduate about other women undergraduates". This claim was inaccurate, but demonstrates the popularity of Haynes's work and its status within the genre. Between 1928 and 1930, she worked for the publisher Geoffrey Bles.

Haynes married the Irish writer Jerrard Tickell in 1929, and the couple had three children: Crispin, Patrick, and Tom. She converted to Catholicism in 1942. Jerrard Tickell died in 1966.

== Career ==
Haynes, who published under her maiden name, followed Neapolitan Ice with Immortal John (1932), The Holy Hunger (1935), and Pan, Caesar and God: Who Spake by the Prophets (1938). She worked for the British Council 1941–1967, rising to become director of book reviews.

In 1961 she published The Hidden Springs: An Enquiry into Extra-sensory Perception, and in 1976 her second book on extra-sensory perception, The Seeing Eye, The Seeing I, appeared.

In 1970, Haynes published Philosopher King: a book about Pope Benedict XIV.

She joined the Society for Psychical Research 1946, following a conversation with Theodora Bosanquet, becoming a member of its council in 1957, and serving for a time as a vice-president. Haynes was editor of the SPR's journal 1970–1981, and later wrote the organisation's history, published as The Society for Psychical Research 1882-1982: A History (1982). She published widely on psychical subjects, including for the press and in essay collections.

== Death ==
Renée Haynes died on 12 October 1992 at the age of 86. The Times praised her as having had:

an original and wide-ranging mind, a lively way of writing (with phrases which linger in the memory) and a deep sense of humanity and historical continuity.

== Bibliography ==
- Neapolitan Ice (1928)
- Immortal John (1932)
- The Holy Hunger (1935)
- Pan, Caesar and God (1938)
- Hilaire Belloc (1953)
- The Hidden Springs: An Enquiry into Extra-sensory Perception (1961)
- Philosopher King: The Humanist Pope Benedict XIV (1970)
- The Seeing Eye, The Seeing I: Perception, Sensory and Extrasensory (1976)
- The Society for Psychical Research 1882-1982: A History (1982)
