= L'Etac de Sark =

Island in Guernsey

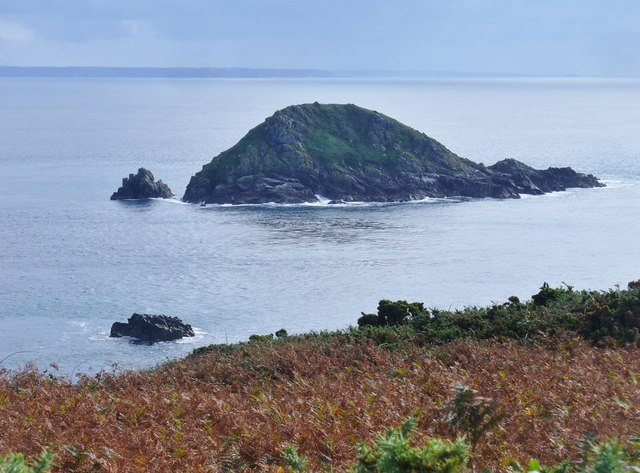
- L'Etac from Sark
- Interactive map of L'Etac de Sark
- Other name: L'Etac

Geography
- Location: English Channel
- Coordinates: 49°24′05″N 2°22′03″W
- Archipelago: Channel Islands
- Adjacent to: Sark
- Area: 3 acres (1.2 ha)
- Highest elevation: 69 m (226 ft)

Administration
- Bailiwick of Guernsey

L'Etac de Sark (/leɪˈtæk/ lay-TAHK) is a small uninhabited island that is part of the Bailiwick of Guernsey in the Channel Islands. It is immediately southeast of Sark and covers approximately 3 acres (1.2 ha).

== Etymology ==
The name L'Etac (or L'Étacq) derives from the Old Norse word stakkr, meaning a steep-sided rock or pile. Local Norman dialect adapted this to estac and subsequent French phonetic changes lead to the modern spelling. The name served as a topographical marker and was not uncommon: The village of L'Étacq in Jersey is of the same name.

== History ==
Since 6 August 1565 L'Etac has been part of the Fief of Sark. Under the original charter granted by Elizabeth I the Seigneur of Sark was granted the island and "all adjacent islets and rocks".

== Geography ==
L'Etac rises sheer to a height of 69 metres (226 ft). It is 150–200 metres (500–650 ft) off the southern tip of Little Sark. The island is 1.5 km (0.9 miles) south of the La Coupée isthmus that connects Great Sark and Little Sark.

== Geology ==
L'Etac is made of Little Sark Granodiorite, a type of igneous rock that is quartz-dioritic. This rock is part of the Little Sark pluton that accounts for all of Little Sark and its surrounding islets. This rock is richer in dark mica than standard granite which gives it a grey to black appearance.

These rocks were intruded 611 million years ago during the Precambrian age. Like much of Sark L'Etac's bedrock is heavily faulted and foliated. It is part of the Armorican Massif, a geological region that connects the Channel Islands to Lower Normandy and Brittany in France.

== Ecology ==
L'Etac hosts breeding seabirds. Surveys conducted in 2022 and 2024 included L'Etac in census results for guillemot colonies. The island has been identified as a candidate location for rat eradication due to the suspected presence of invasive black rats which predate on eggs and chicks.

The waters surrounding L'Etac are part of a broader plan by the Blue Marine Foundation and La Société Sercquaise to designate a 274 Marine Protected Area (MPA) to protect marine habitats.
