= Johann Hinkel =

German politician (1890–1943)

Major Johann Hinkel (1890 – 28 March 1943) was the German representative in Sark from 1942 until March 1943 when he was killed after he stepped on a mine in Sark.

| Preceded by Stefan Herdt | German Representative in Sark; 1942–1943 | Succeeded by Stefan Herdt |

== Bibliography ==
- Francis Walter Falla "The Silent War" 1967, p 224
- Peter King "The Channel Islands War, 1940-1945" 1991, pp. 36, 167
