= E. S. P. Haynes =

British lawyer and writer (1877–1949)

Edmund Sidney Pollock Haynes
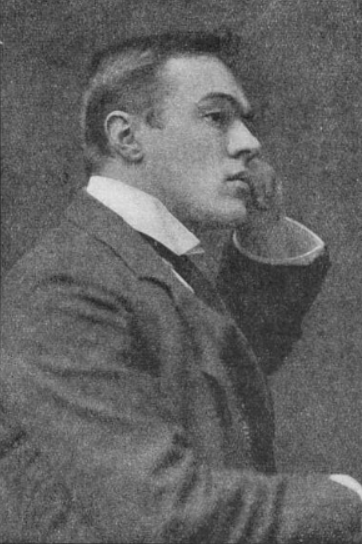
- Born: 26 September 1877
- Died: 5 January 1949 (aged 71)
- Occupations: Lawyer, writer

Edmund Sidney Pollock Haynes (26 September 1877 – 5 January 1949) was a British lawyer and writer.

== Biography ==
The son of a London solicitor, Haynes was a King's Scholar at Eton College and a winner of a Brackenbury Scholarship at Balliol College. John Moore later said that Haynes at Oxford was "witty, polished, [and] brilliant". Haynes formed a close friendship with Edward Thomas, who recorded in his diary (22 February 1899): "I like Haynes & yet detest the brilliant, vicious society at Balliol. Haynes himself is utterly immoral; but still with many fine feelings & purposes, I think..."

Haynes practised as a lawyer in the same offices at 9 New Square, Lincoln's Inn, where his father had practised. A prolific author, he was a well-known figure in London's literary circles from 1900 to his death in 1949. His daughter was novelist Renée Haynes.

Hilaire Belloc's 1912 work The Servile State is dedicated to Haynes. In The Decline of Liberty in England (1916), Haynes lamented the growth of a "vast and irresponsible bureaucracy" and the decline in respect for personal rights by the state, the press and public opinion. He said that the state should run social services but rejected the way in which "from modern Berlin Mr Lloyd George and his friends have imported their experiments in establishing the Servile State". He also advocated the decriminalisation of homosexuality. He ended the book with a dystopian view of England's collectivist future. The English Review said in its review: "Mr. Haynes is a rational anarchist, or shall we say an anarchistic rationalist? It is not a bad configuration, and when he lets fly he is good reading, pleasingly fermentative, ardently cynical, almost religiously personal. He dislikes virginity, he disdains fidelity. Altogether a stimulant, for Mr. Haynes is a palpable man".

== Skepticism ==
Haynes was an atheist. He was also a rationalist, his book The Belief in Personal Immortality (1913) was skeptical of the claims of psychical research and life after death.

== Publications ==
- Standards of Taste in Art (1904).
- Religious Persecution, a Study in Political Psychology (1904; popular edition, 1906).
- Early Victorian and Other Papers (1908).
- Divorce Problems of To-Day (1912).
- The Belief in Personal Immortality (1913 and 1925).
- A Study in Bereavement, a Comedy in One Act (1914).
- Divorce as it might be (1915).
- The Decline of Liberty in England (1916).
- Personalia (1918 and 1927).
- The Case for Liberty (1919).
- Concerning Solicitors (1920).
- The Enemies of Liberty (1923).
- Fritto Misto (1924).
- Lycurgus or The Future of Law (1925).
- Much Ado about Women (1927).
- A Lawyer's Notebook (1932).
- More from a Lawyer's Notebook (1933).
- The Lawyer's Last Notebook (1934).
- Divorce and its Problems (with Derek Walker-Smith, 1935).
- Life, Law, and Letters (1936).
