= La Sablonnerie =

Hotel in Sark

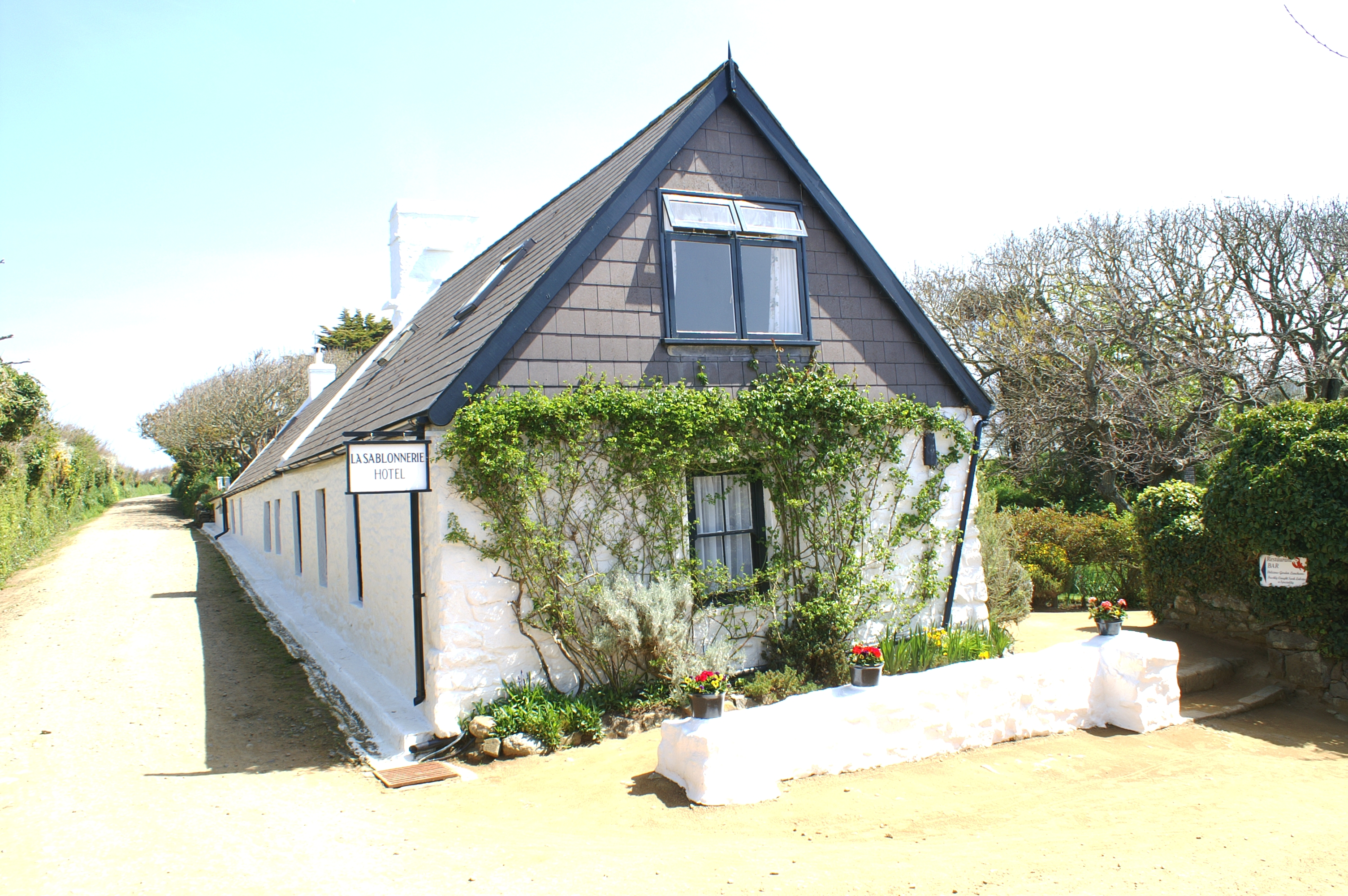

- Location in the Channel Islands

General information
- Location: Little Sark, Sark, Little Sark, Isle of Sark, Bailiwick of Guernsey, Channel Islands GY10 1SD
- Coordinates: 49°26′1″N 2°21′5″W
- Opening: 1948
- Owner: Elizabeth Perree

Other information
- Number of rooms: 22

Website
- Official site

La Sablonnerie is a hotel and restaurant in Sark, in the Channel Islands. It is located in Little Sark, in an old 16th century farmhouse with gardens. Owned by Elizabeth Perree, the hotel contains 15 double rooms, 6 single rooms and one suite. The 2002 Good Hotel Guide describes the hotel as "Long, low and white-walled... a stylish, idiosyncratic little hotel, much admired." The restaurant is noted for its seafood dishes (especially lobster) and cream teas.

The hotel offers nearby access to the most secluded features of the island including the natural tidal bathing pools, caves and walks to the nearby historic silver mines, caves and scrambles leading down to the sea.

== History ==
On 14–15 July 1940, two weeks after the German occupation of the Channel Islands, a British commando raid, code name Operation Ambassador visited Sark, rather than the intended Guernsey as a result of a faulty compass. Landing on Little Sark the team explored La Sablonnerie and not finding any Germans returned safely to the destroyer.
