= Little Sark =

Peninsula

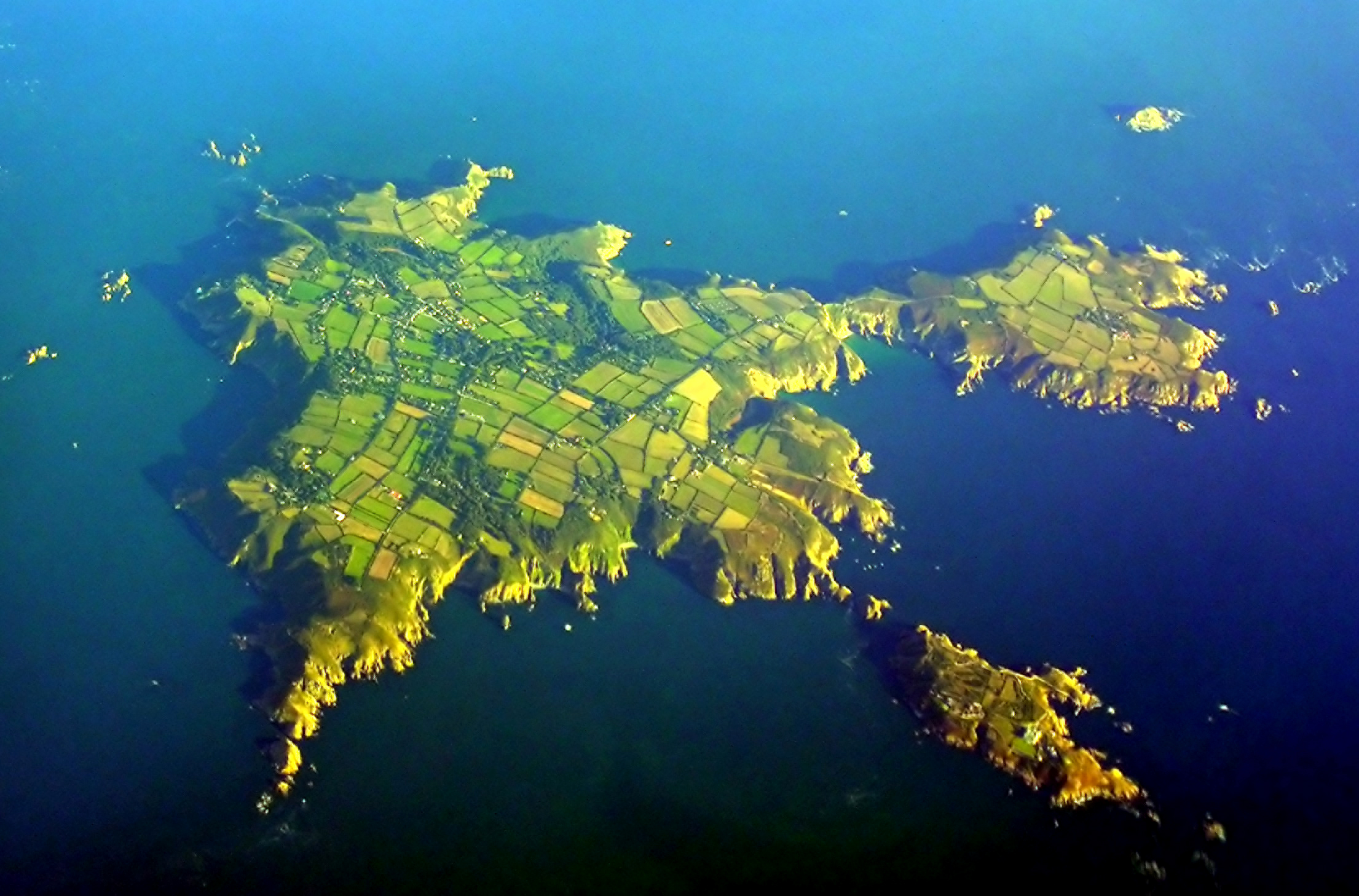
Aerial view of Sark – Little Sark is on the right of the image

Little Sark is a peninsula forming the southern section of the Channel Island of Sark. There is a hamlet, and a hotel and cafe at La Sablonnerie.

== Geography ==
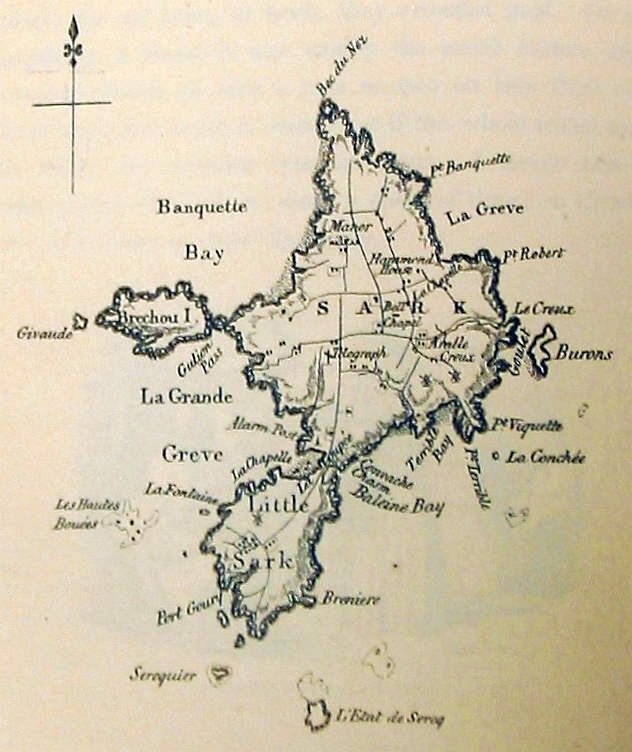
In this 1857 map, Little Sark can be seen in the south.

Little Sark is roughly triangular in shape, some 5/8 mile (1 kilometre) in width in the south and 1 mile (1.5 kilometres) in length from north to south. It is joined to the larger part of the island, Great Sark by a narrow isthmus known as La Coupée, a high ridge 80 metres (262 ft) above the sea which is only some 10 feet (3 m) in width. This is gradually being eroded and Little Sark will eventually become an island (a similar process is likely to have occurred with Brecqhou close to Sark's west coast).

Several small islets lie close to the shore of Little Sark. These include Moie de la Fontaine and Moie de la Bretagne on the west coast, Petite Baveuse, Moie du Port Gorey Seceuil and Bretagne Uset along the south coast, and Brenière on the east coast. Several tiny islets also lie in Baleine Bay, which stretches along much of the east coast of Little Sark and also the southeast coast of Great Sark, and L'Etac de Sark and les Demies lie to the southeast of Little Sark.

The west coast of Little Sark is rocky, but there are two notable beaches to the north and east. The beach of Pot Bay stretches along the east coast from north of Brenière to Avocat Point, but this is a minor attraction compared to La Grande Grève, Sark's largest and most popular beach, which lies along the north coast of Little Sark and is normally accessible via steps cut in La Coupée (after a landslip temporarily closed the steps down to the shore a second way down has now (2016) been prepared and is usable). There are also popular swimming spots at the Venus Pool and Adonis Pool. The former (or Venus's Bath, as it is also known), named as such by Victorian artist William Toplis, lies close to the southeasternmost point of Little Sark. Protected and overhung by granite cliffs, it is largely free from prevailing winds and is a fine swimming spot. Completely covered by the sea at high tide, at low tide a circular pool originally some eighteen feet (five metres) deep (recent rockfalls have decreased its depth substantially) is separated from the sea. A smaller pool, Cupid's Bath, is also found nearby. The Adonis Pool is a similar tidal pool, though deeper, larger and less easily accessible than the Venus Pool; it is located close to the southwesternmost tip of Little Sark. The Adonis Pool enjoys longer periods of sunshine then the Venus Pool but is separated from the mainland at anything approaching half tide (the pool is covered by the sea at high tide) by a deep and fast flowing race of water where visitors require experience or careful instruction to cross to the Adonis rock safely.

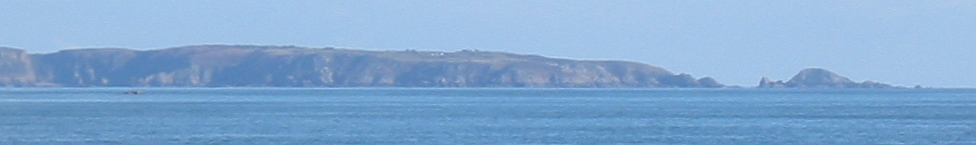
The west coast of Little Sark, as seen from Guernsey, with L'Etac de Sark at right

Though the west coast is rocky, it is noted for its fine scenery. La Fontaine Bay, named for a small spring located nearby, is particularly well known for its views. The ruggedness of the coast means there are no excellent anchorages around Little Sark, though Port Gorey, the larger off two inlets in the south coast, was formerly used as a harbour.

Typically for Sark, Little Sark is penetrated at sea level by a number of caves and interconnecting inlets, including the extensive and dramatic, though surprisingly hidden cave system known as La Louge, which forms a pattern in and around the southern headland in roughly the shape of a double cross. A small bathing pool known as Teddy's Bath sits slightly higher in the cliff side near one arm of La Louge.

== La Coupée ==
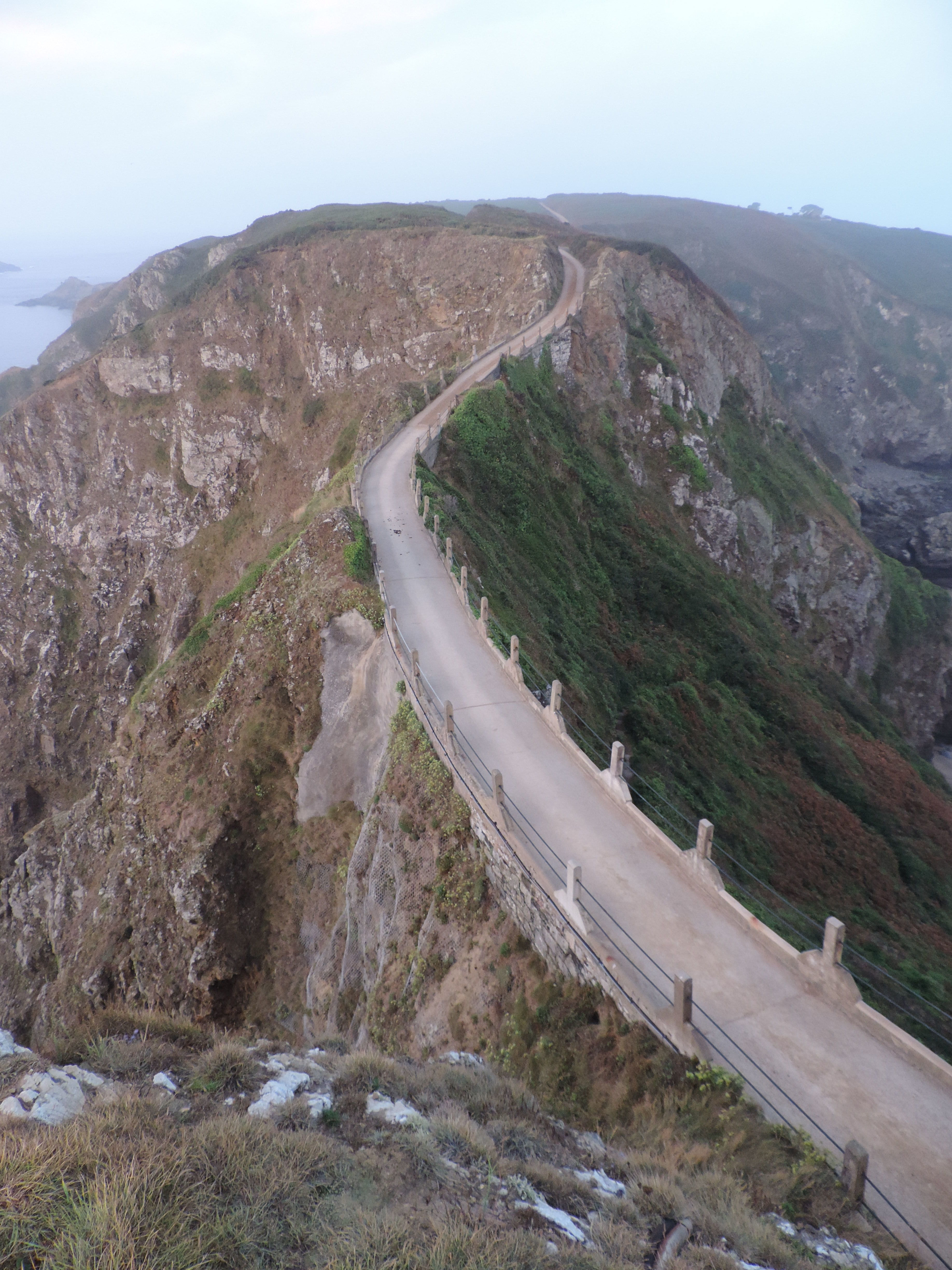
La Coupée is the narrow isthmus which links Greater and Little Sark

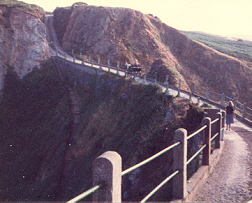
Another view of La Coupée

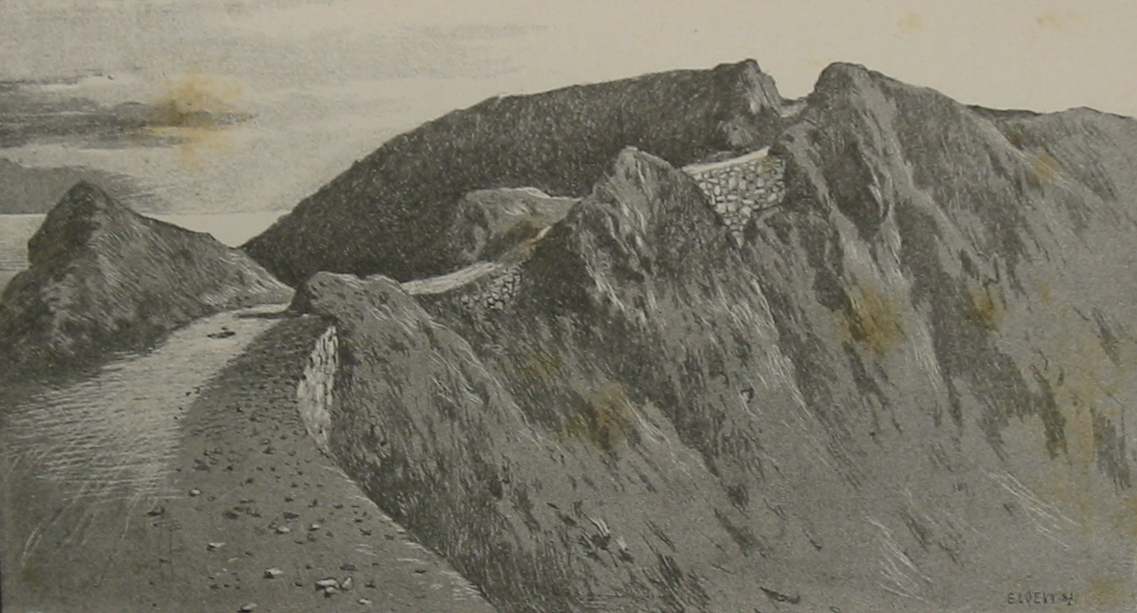
This 19th-century illustration shows La Coupée before the addition of railings and the paving of the roadway

La Coupée is an isthmus joining Great Sark and Little Sark in the Channel Islands at 49°25.25′N 2°21.97′W. The land on both sides of this causeway has been eroded away by the sea, and all that now connects Little Sark to the rest of the island is a narrow ridge a mere three metres (nine feet) wide and 90 metres (300 ft) in length, with a drop of close to 80 metres (260 ft) on either side.

Until the beginning of the twentieth century, access to Little Sark was extremely difficult or, at best, unnerving. La Coupée was traversed by a narrow dirt track, and children are reputed to have had to crawl across it on their hands and knees to prevent being blown over the edge by the wind. According to a description in 1875, "People have thrown themselves flat on their face, from terror and nervousness on reaching the Coupée; others have lost courage half way across, and have hidden themselves behind the heads of the rocks that crop up in the middle of the Coupée until some passer by came and led them along; others have been unable to get across without shutting their eyes and being led between two persons." On 4 September 1802, Elie Guille of the Clos-à-Jaon was carrying sheaves of corn across La Coupée for the payment of tithes. He was blown over the East side and killed. After that the Seigneurs farmed out the collection of tithes in Little Sark to an individual in Little Sark who could settle the dues in cash. There were for a long time arguments between the inhabitants and the Seigneur over whose responsibility it was to maintain the path across La Coupée. In 1811 a landslip reduced the width of the path to no more than 3 feet. Finally in 1812 an act of agreement was signed between the parties to ensure every male inhabitant subject to the ordinary repairs of the road would give two days' corvée to the La Coupée road and in return the Seigneur would guarantee to provide all remaining expenses. Following another landslip in 1862 on the Little Sark side a retaining wall was constructed so as to provide a foundation for a roadway 8–10 feet wide. However the narrowness of the path and the vertiginous drop were not the only things that made many wary of crossing La Coupée, especially at night, as the locality was reputed to be haunted. Strange moaning sounds or unearthly shrieks have been reported; however, these have been explained away as being due to the actions of wave and tide in La Caverne des Lamentes in the bay. The black dog called the Tchico was also reputed to haunt La Coupée as it ran the roads of Sark. Sibyl Hathaway, Dame of Sark, recorded that some of the Islanders believed that the reason why her donkey would not cross La Coupée was because of sensitivity to the presence of the Tchico.

Protective railings were added to La Coupée in 1900. There is currently a narrow concrete road covering the entirety of the isthmus, built in 1945 by German prisoners of war under the direction of the Royal Engineers.

The isthmus is flanked by two bays: La Grand Grêve to the west (right as seen from Great Sark) and Convanche Bay, part of Baleine Bay, to the east. The drop to Convanche Bay is steep, but that to La Grand Grêve is more gradual and steps have been cut into the rock, leading down to what is Sark's most extensive and popular beach.

== Settlement ==
Because they were partially isolated from Great Sark, the inhabitants of Little Sark had their own distinct form of Sercquiais, the native Norman dialect of the island. The peninsula is sparsely populated, with most of the houses close to La Sablonnerie, the peninsula's only hotel, to the south of the centre of the peninsula. There are the remains of fortifications to the north, close to La Coupée, and an old mill to the west of La Sablonnerie.

Little Sark contains five of Sark's tenements.

== Mining ==
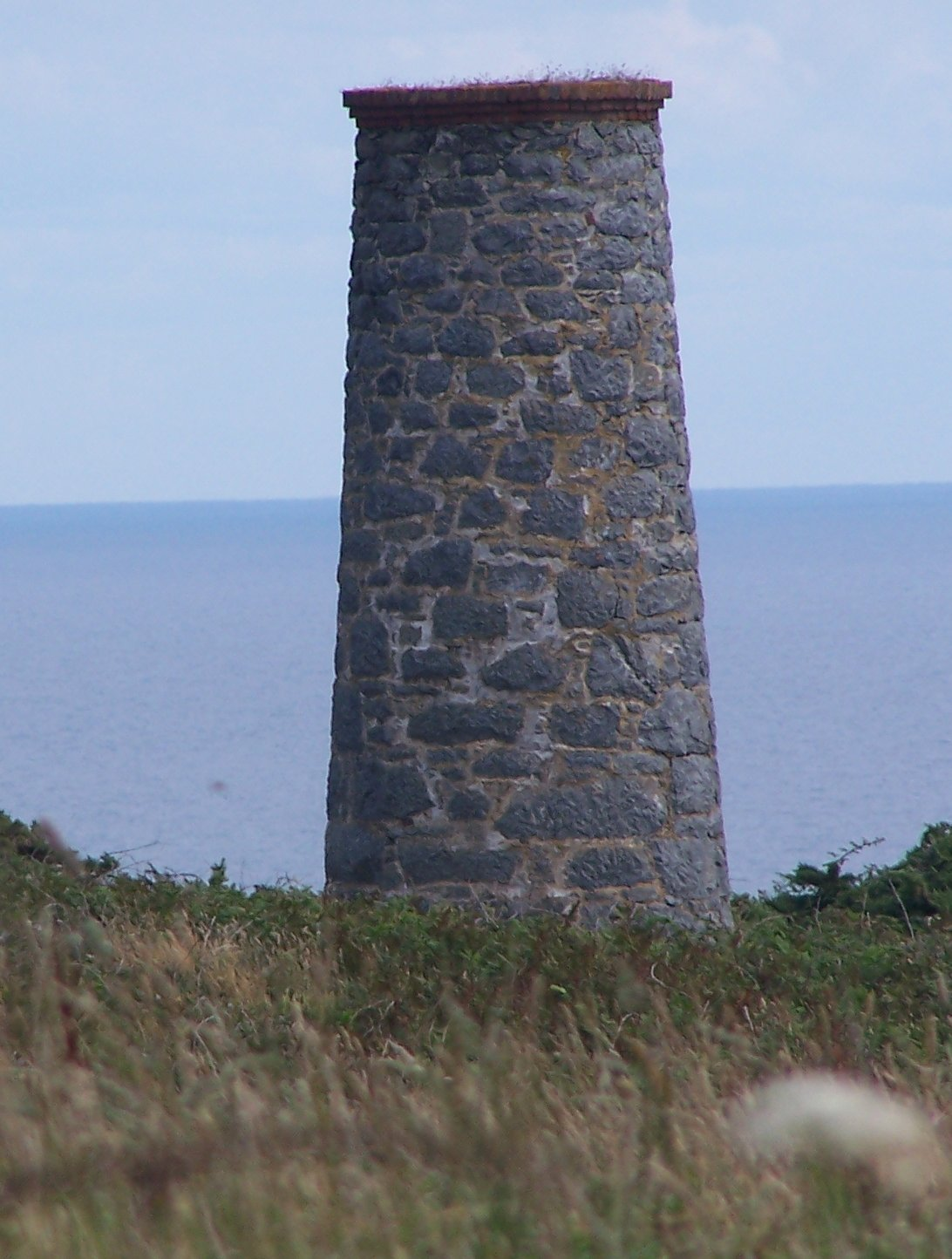
Former mine shaft in Sark

Little Sark was synonymous with silver mining for some of its history; La Clôture du Bas, the southern part of Little Sark, in particular had a number of mines. Mining mainly occurred between 1833 and 1845, and at its height the mines employed up to 80 workers from Sark and Cornwall, the Cornish immigrants doubling the population of the area.

Copper and silver were both mined at Le Pot, close to Pot Bay on the peninsula's east coast. It was here that silver was first discovered in 1833 by John Hunt, although there are earlier claims dating to 1817. Mining only took place for three years before Le Pot was abandoned due to flooding. The severe financial problems this caused almost resulted in the bankruptcy of the incumbent Seigneur, Ernest le Pelley. The Le Pelleys were obliged to transfer the fief to the Collings family, of whom the current Seigneur is a descendant. Remains of this mine can still be seen.

As a source of galena, the mine near Port Gorey returned both lead and silver. Discovered by chance during a rabbit hunt in 1836, industry around this mine led to the construction of a small gauge railway and the installation of steam pumps. The mine is believed to have had a length of 2,000 feet/600 m and depth of 700 feet/200 m. Close to the port there were four shafts leading to the galleries. Sark's Hope shaft was the westernmost, almost on the edge of the cliff. To the East was Le Pelley shaft, excavated down to 90 fathoms below sea level, then the Pump shaft and the easternmost shaft, the Prince's shaft.

Mining ceased in 1845 for reasons of economy and geology. Running costs were high, largely because of costs of shipping fuel for the steam pumps and shipping of ore, and ore-producing veins were narrow and of poor quality. The mines returned very little silver overall, and only one cargo of ore was ever shipped from Port Gorey. However the mines attracted visitors from Guernsey which encouraged the development of tourism infrastructure to cater for tourists who found the beauty of Sark's landscape a reason to continue visiting after the closure of the mines.

John Oxenham's 1910 novel A Maid of the Silver Sea uses the mines of Little Sark, as well as La Coupée, as its setting.
