= Alderney cattle =

Channel Island breed of dairy cattle

Alderney
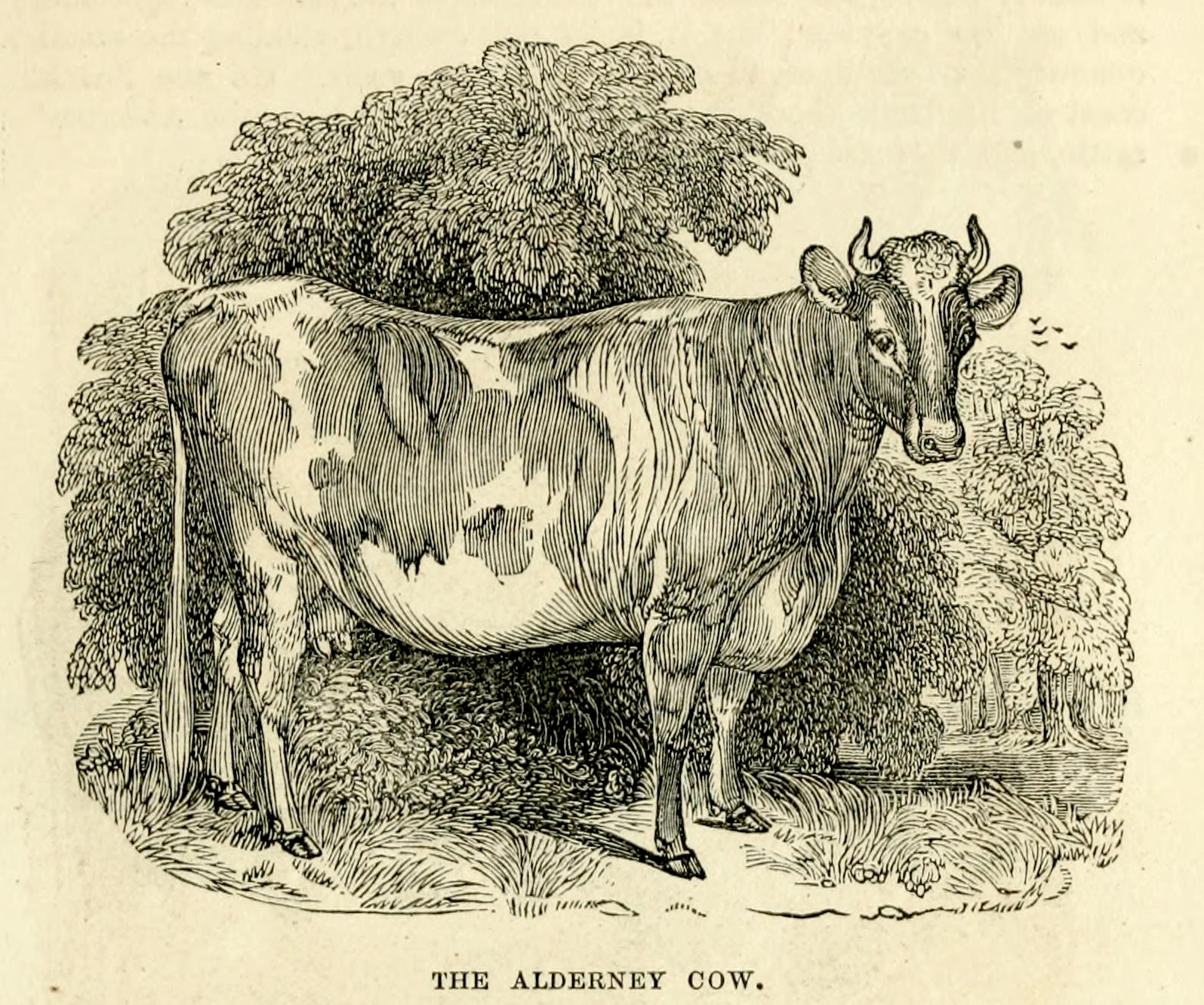
- Cow, engraving from 1834

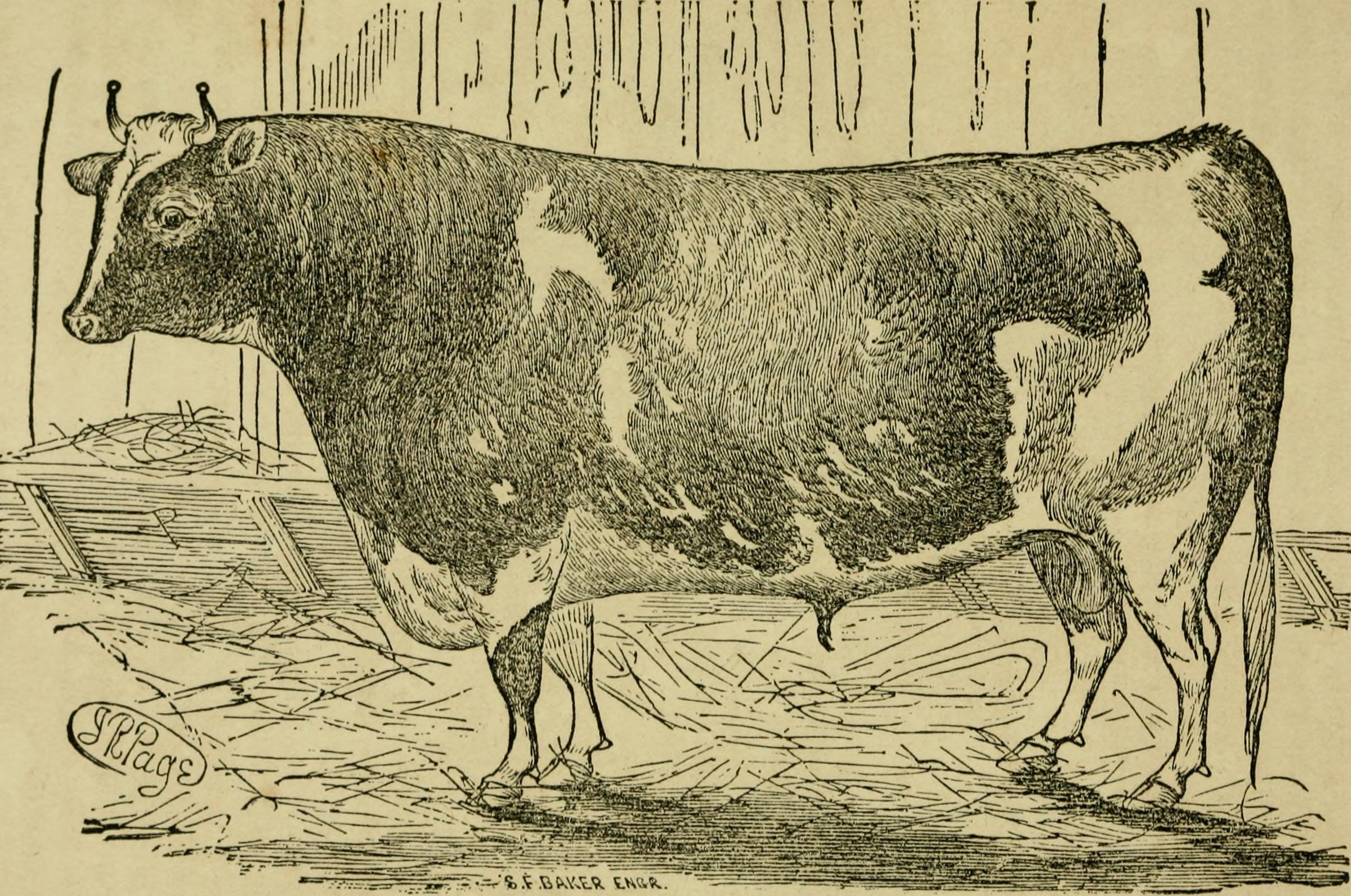
- Bull, illustration from 1860
- Conservation status: extinct
- Country of origin: Channel Islands
- Distribution: British Isles
- Use: dairy

Traits
- Coat: dun, fawn, light red or yellow, with or without patches of white
- Horn status: short
- Cattle; Bos (primigenius) taurus

The Alderney is an extinct breed of dairy cattle. It originated in – and is named for – the island of Alderney in the Channel Islands. It was one of three breeds of Channel Island cattle, the others being the Jersey and the Guernsey. In the eighteenth and nineteenth centuries "Alderney" was a general term for cattle from the archipelago; many were exported to mainland Britain under this name, regardless of which of the islands they came from.

== History ==
Cattle are thought to have been brought to the Channel Islands during the tenth and eleventh centuries, possibly from about AD 960 when Richard I of Normandy is believed to have sent monks from Mont-Saint-Michel to help the islanders to defend themselves against attacks by pirates. These monks are thought to have brought with them cattle of Norman or Breton type, perhaps similar to the modern Froment du Léon of Brittany; these were used principally as draught animals, but also as dairy cattle. Later, when horses replaced oxen for draught work, the cattle began to be selected for milk alone.

From the seventeenth century or from no later than 1724, cattle from the Channel Islands began to be exported in considerable numbers to mainland Britain. Regardless of which island they came from, these were invariably known as "Alderneys"; this may have been because Alderney, lying to the north of the other main islands, would have been the last port of call before the Channel crossing. In the mid-1770s some 900 cattle were being shipped to Britain each year under the Alderney name, about two thirds of them from the island of Jersey. They were kept mostly by wealthy landowners as decorative "park cattle", though the quality of the milk and of the butter made from it was recognised.

The Alderney contributed to the development of a number of British breeds, principally the Ayrshire and the South Devon. It may also have influenced the Dairy Shorthorn (through its predecessor the Holderness), the Irish Kerry and the Suffolk Dun.

By the early twentieth century there were few of the cattle remaining in the island: in 1910 the total number registered was 580. Of the seventy-five farmers keeping them, about half had no more than four and only two had more than twenty. During the Second World War the people of Alderney were moved, with their cattle, to the island of Guernsey; the Alderney was absorbed into the Guernsey breed.

== Characteristics ==
The Alderney was small; its conformation was typical of a dairy breed, with a light bone structure and a somewhat deer-like appearance. The colour of the coat was variable, ranging through shades of dun, fawn, light red and yellow, either with or without patches of white.

== Use ==
The cattle of the Channel Islands were originally used principally as draught animals; later, when horses replaced oxen for draught work, the cattle were reared for milk alone.

The milk was rich in fat, and suitable for butter-making. A description from 1909 says of it "The Alderney ranks as the best butter cow in the world, whilst its abundant yield of milk, rich in cream, is phenomenal"; by 1939 the same sentence had been altered to read "The Jersey ...".
