= Guernsey cattle =

Channel Island breed of cattle

Guernsey
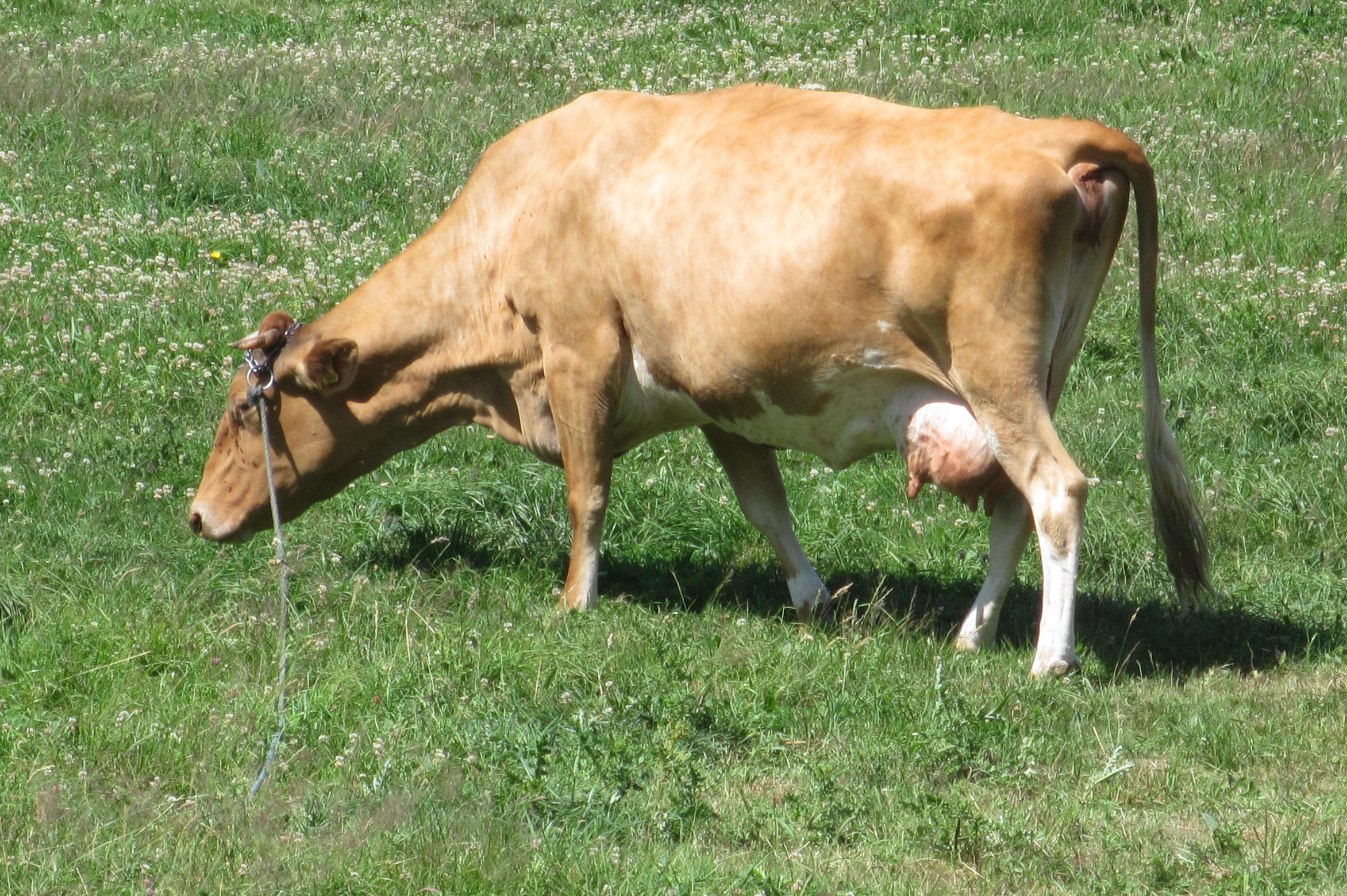
- Conservation status: FAO (2007): not at risk
- Country of origin: Guernsey, Channel Islands
- Distribution: world-wide
- Use: milk

Traits
- Weight: Male: 600–700 kg; Female: 450–500 kg
- Coat: fawn or red-and-white
- Horn status: horned
- Cattle; Bos (primigenius) taurus

The Guernsey is a breed of dairy cattle from the island of Guernsey in the Channel Islands. It is fawn or red-and-white in colour, and is hardy and docile. The milk is rich in flavour, high in milk-fat and milk protein, and has a high content of β-carotene which gives it a golden-yellow tinge. It is one of three Channel Island cattle breeds, the others being the Alderney – now extinct – and the Jersey.

== History ==
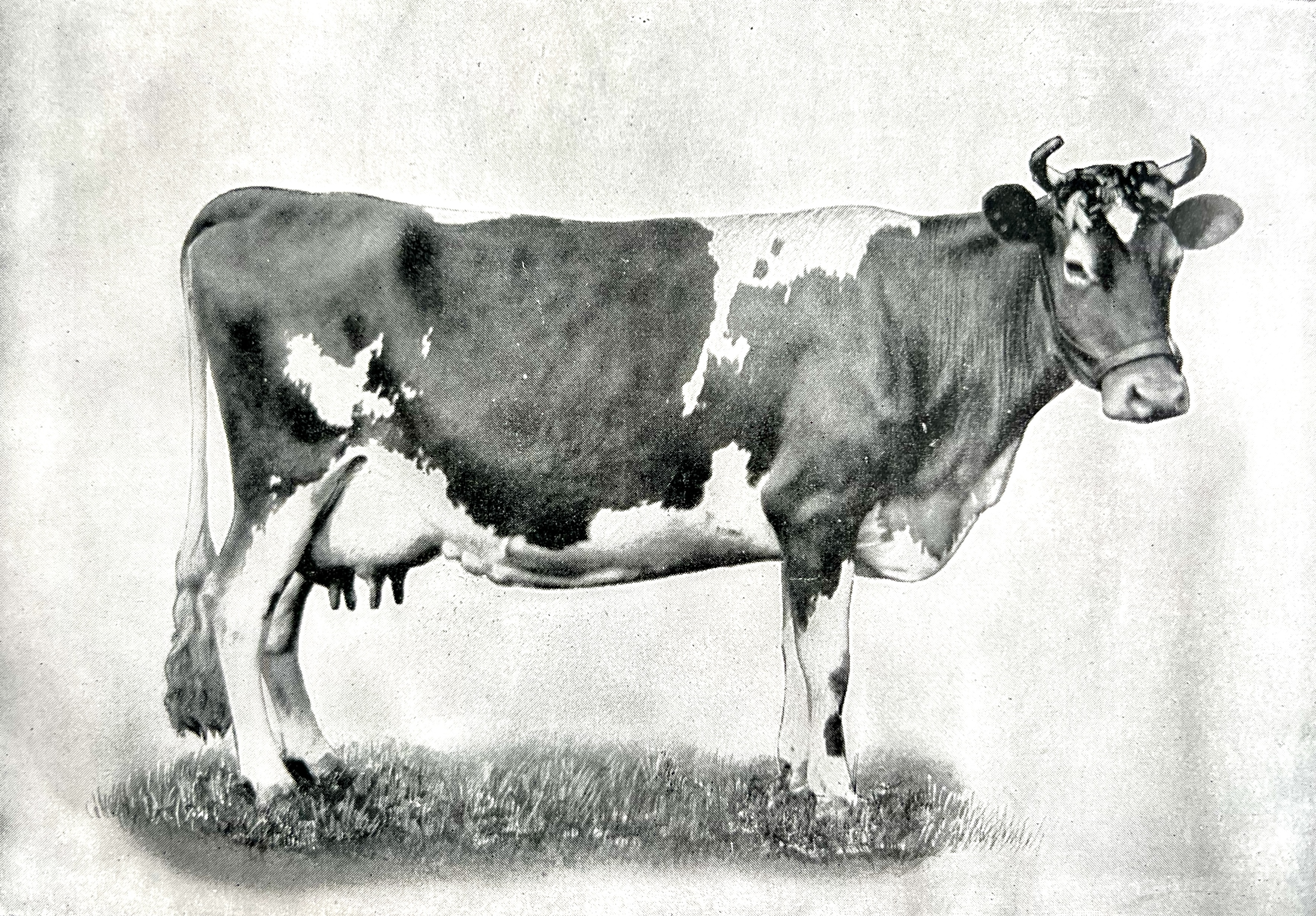
Cow, image from Encyclopædia Britannica, eleventh edition, 1911

The Guernsey was bred on the Channel Island of Guernsey; it is first documented in the nineteenth century, and its origins are unknown. Cattle were brought to the island in the Middle Ages for draught work. It has been suggested that the Guernsey derives from cattle imported from the French mainland: brindled cattle from Normandy, and wheaten stock similar to the Froment du Léon of Brittany. There may also have been some influence from Dutch cattle in the eighteenth century. During that century, large numbers of cattle were exported from the Channel Islands to England; some of them had previously been brought from France. Imports of French cattle to Guernsey were forbidden by law in 1819, but some importation of British cattle continued until 1877. Some cattle evacuated from Alderney during the Second World War were merged into the breed.

Exports of cattle and semen were, for a while, an important economic resource for the island; in the early 20th century, a large number of Guernsey cattle were exported to the United States. The Guernsey breed is on the watch list maintained by the American Livestock Breeds Conservancy, with fewer than 2,500 annual registrations in the U.S. and an estimated global population of less than 10,000 animals.

== Characteristics ==
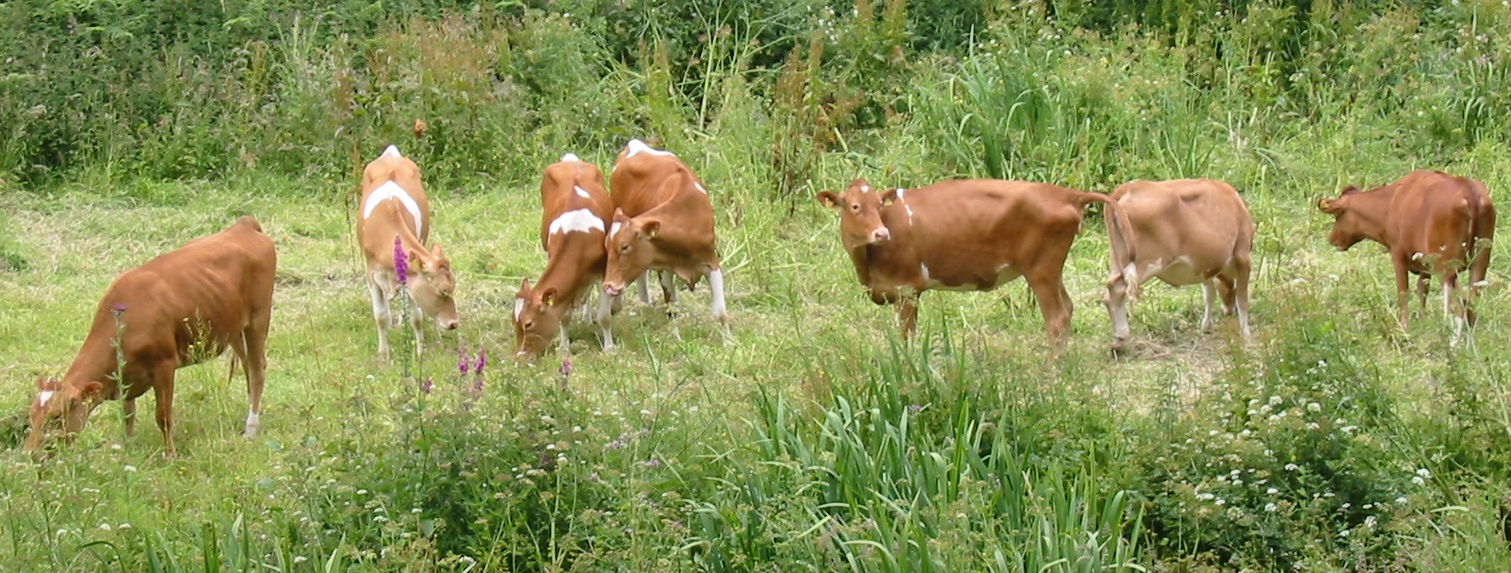
Heifers in Saint Saviour, Guernsey

The Guernsey is of medium size: cows weigh 450 to 500 kg, and bulls 600 to 700 kg. The coat is red or fawn (wheat-coloured), and may or may not be pied red-and-white or fawn-and-white. The Guernsey produces rich and flavoursome milk. It traditionally had several other good qualities: it was long-lived, calved without difficulty, grazed well and – being relatively small-sized – was an efficient milk producer. These advantages have been compromised by recent selective breeding strategies, which have led to larger animals, with longer legs. These no longer display the traditional qualities of the breed; this is particularly marked where there has been cross-breeding with Holstein-Friesian stock.

== Use ==
The Guernsey is a dairy breed, and generally is reared for that purpose only. The milk has a golden-yellow tinge caused by a high content of β-carotene, a provitamin for vitamin A. The milk also has a high milk-fat content of 5% and a high milk protein content of 3.7%. Guernsey cows produce around 6000 litres per cow per year.
