= South Devon cattle =

British breed of cattle

South Devon
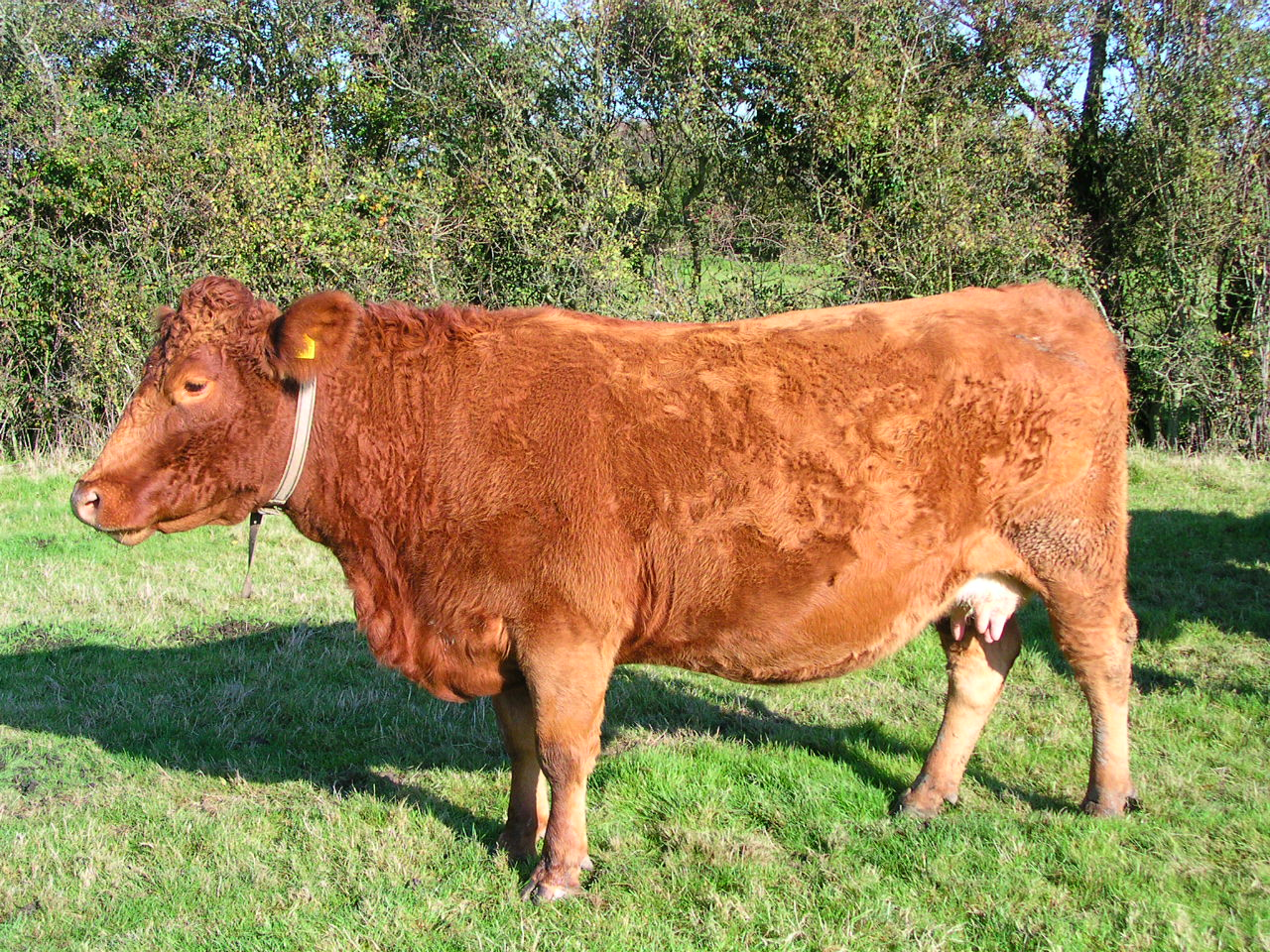
- A cow
- Conservation status: FAO (2007): not at risk; DAD-IS (2021): not at risk; RBST (2021–2022): not at risk
- Other names: Hammer; South Hams
- Country of origin: United Kingdom
- Standard: South Devon Herd Book Society
- Use: formerly triple-purpose: milk/meat/draught; since 1972: meat

Traits
- Weight: Male: average 1144 kg; Female: average 800 kg
- Height: Male: average 152 cm; Female: average 140 cm
- Cattle; Bos (primigenius) taurus

The South Devon is a British breed of large beef cattle. It originated in the counties of Devon and Cornwall in south-west England, and is mentioned from the eighteenth century. It was a dual-purpose breed, kept both for its milk and for beef. Since 1972 selection has been for beef only.

== History ==
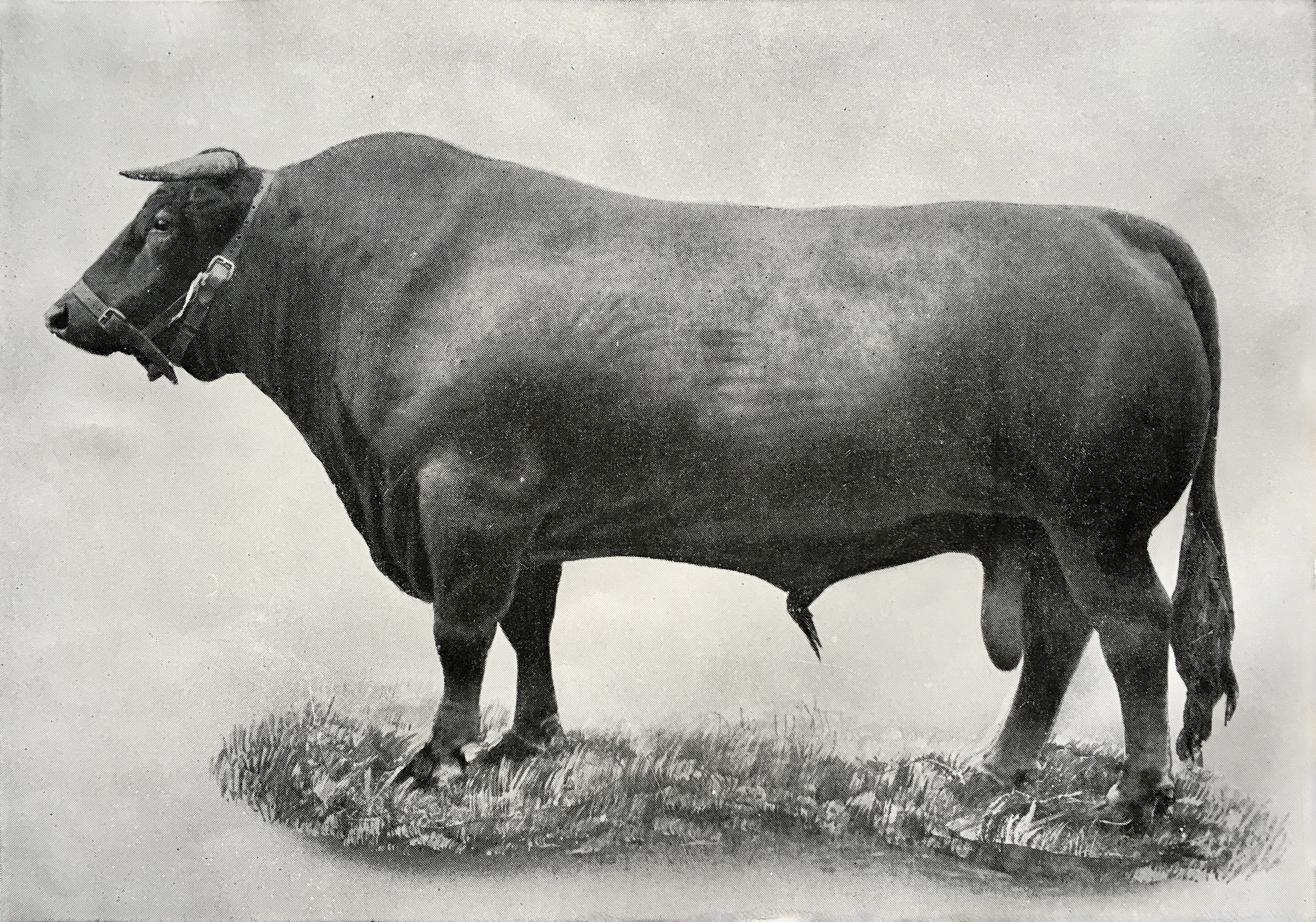
Bull, photograph by Frank Babbage from the Encyclopædia Britannica, 1911

The South Devon originated in the counties of Devon and Cornwall in south-west England: the earliest mentions of it are from the eighteenth century. How it developed is not known; one theory is that it arose from cross-breeding between local Devon stock and Channel Islands cattle such as the Alderney. Unlike other British breeds, the South Devon carries the gene for haemoglobin B, which is also present in the Channel Island breeds.

The South Devon Herd Book Society of England was formed, and published the first edition of the herdbook in 1891.

Some were exported to the United States in either 1936 or 1969,, and then again in 1974. A breed society was formed in 1972.

== Characteristics ==
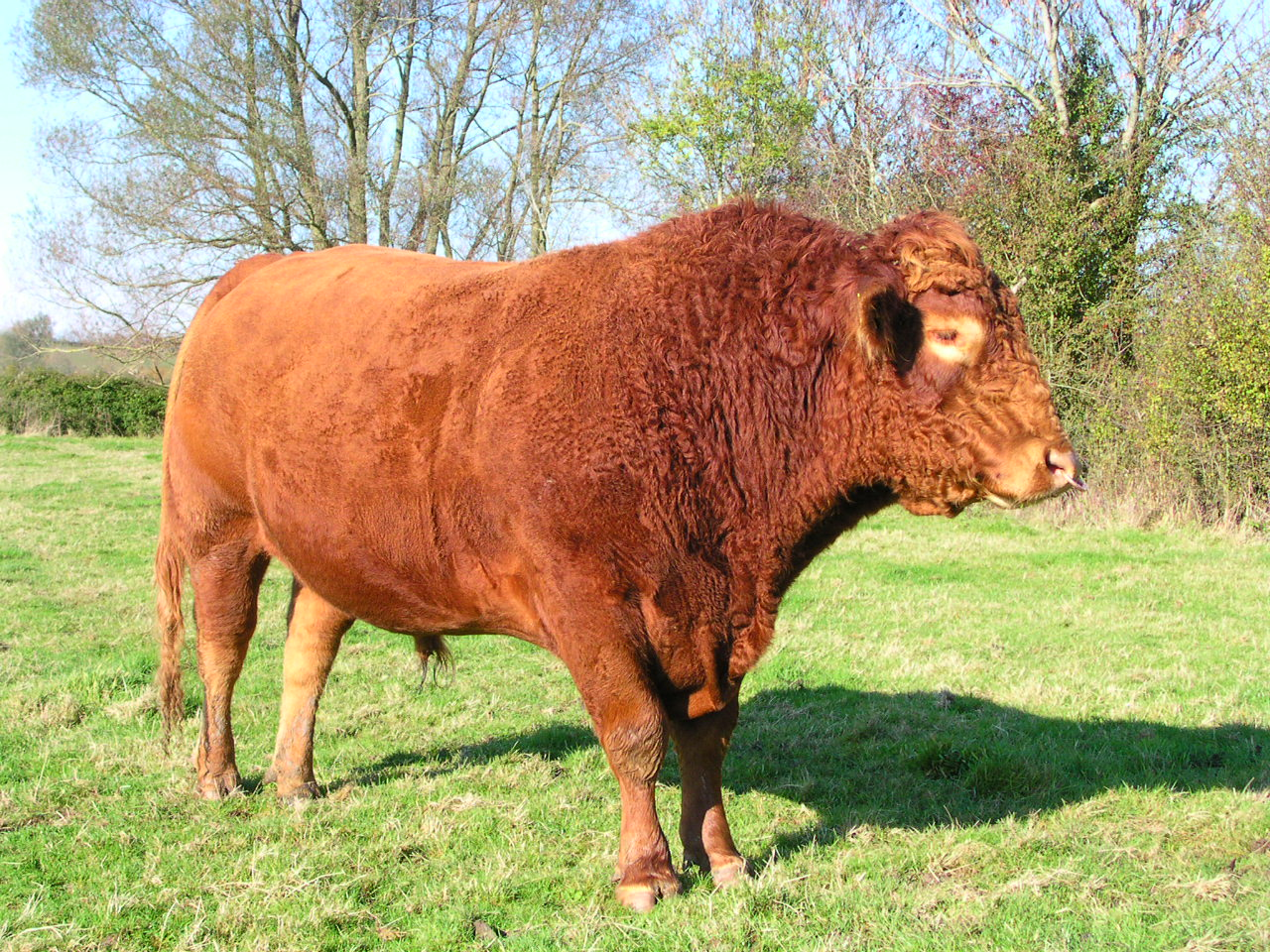
Bull at Amberley in West Sussex

The South Devon is a large breed: bulls stand on average 152 cm at the withers, cows some 12 cm less. The coat is curly and light red in colour; the cattle are both larger and paler than other British breeds of red cattle. They may be either horned or polled; the horns are yellowish or white, and downward-curved.

== Use ==
Until the early part of the nineteenth century the South Devon was a triple-purpose animal, kept for its milk, for meat and for draught work. Thereafter it was a dual-purpose breed, valued for its dairy qualities while the quality of the carcase was not high. In the early twentieth century, the average milk yield was over 3200 kg per lactation; a good cow might give 5000 kg, and at least one reached 6200 kg. In 1974 the average lactation yield was 3390 kg, with a fat content of 4.19%; some cows exceeded 10000 kg. The conformation of the udder was not well suited to mechanical milking, and from 1972 selection was for beef only.

It is a large and fast-growing breed. In 1974 the average weight of bullocks at 400 days was 590 kg, with an average height at the withers of 126 cm; some animals reached more than 750 kg in that time. In the twenty-first century the daily weight gain of bullocks in the first 400 days is approximately 1.5 kg.

Approximately 37% of the population carries the 11-bp genetic mutation which causes bovine muscular hypertrophy (or more properly hyperplasia), which in the area of origin of the breed is known as "buffalo". In affected animals this has the expected beneficial influence on carcase yield, and the expected detrimental effects on meat quality and on ease of calving.
