= Gerdt =

Gerdt is a Russian spelling of the Germanic surname Herdt. It may refer to:

- Zinovy Efimovich Gerdt, Russian actor
- Pavel Andreyevich Gerdt or Paul Gerdt (1844–1917), Russian dancer for the Mariinsky Theatre
- Elizaveta Pavlovna Gerdt (Елизавета Павловна Гердт) (1891–1975), Russian dancer and teacher
- Petri Erkki Tapio Gerdt (1983–2002), Finnish chemistry student and Myyrmanni bombing culprit
- Tuomas Gerdt (1922–2020), Finnish soldier, last living Knight of the Mannerheim Cross
