= Stefan Herdt =

German army officer

Oberleutnant Stefan Herdt, also known as Heinz Herdt, was German Representative in Sark from 4 July 1940 to October 1942, and commander of the German garrison.

Born in 1915, he was trained as a teacher before being called up in 1939. Selected for officer training, he served in Poland and Belgium before coming to the Channel Islands, as commander of Company 6 Infantry Regiment 583.

He took office the day after the German occupation, deposing Sibyl Hathaway as the most senior authority in the island with the title Inselkommandant Sark.

During his tenure, Operation Basalt took place, in which three prisoners were killed by British commandos, in one case because the prisoner began shouting to alert nearby German soldiers, and in the other cases the prisoners were killed while attempting to escape during an attack by German forces. Nazi propaganda obscured the details of the event and portrayed it as the execution of prisoners. Herdt was replaced as commander in Sark and reportedly Herdt was to face a court martial but for the reaction by Hitler to the deaths. The raid prompted Hitler to issue an order calling for all British commandos to be summarily executed.

Herdt returned as commander in Sark after the death of Johann Hinkel in March 1943.

Preceded by beginning of occupation Sibyl Mary Hathaway	German Representative in Sark; 1940–1942	Succeeded by Johann Hinkel
