= Flag of Sark =

Sark
- Use: Sark
- Proportion: 3:5
- Adopted: 2020
- Design: Argent, a cross gules, in the canton two lions passant guardant or

The Seigneur's flag. Created in 1938. Used as the Seigneur's personal flag, it was then used as the de facto flag of Sark until 2020.

The flag of Sark consists of a white background with a red Saint George's Cross and a red canton containing the two yellow lions (or in heraldic terms "leopards") from the flag of Normandy. This version of the flag was officially granted in 2020.

Before its official grant, the flag of Sark showed the two lions protruding outside the canton and overflowing the red cross. It was designed by Herbert Pitt in 1938 and then adopted as the personal standard of the Seigneur of Sark before becoming the island's flag.

== History ==
Sark is a Channel Island part of the Bailiwick of Guernsey, originally part of the Duchy of Normandy.

The flag of Sark was designed in 1938 when the Dame of Sark, Sibyl Hathaway, approached Herbert Pitt to design a flag. Herbert Pitt described the flag thus: ''On a White Field, the Red cross of St George. The 1st Quarter ''Gules, 2 lions-leopards passant guardant Or'' (Normandy Ancient). The lion in base impinging on the dexter arm of the Cross.''

The canton is similar to the arms of Normandy, of which the Channel Islands are historically a part. Unlike the classic White Ensigns, the lions of this flag protrude outside the canton and overflow the red cross. The flag was also referred to as the Seigneur's flag. Dame Sibyl once claimed to the Flag Institute that this flag had been in use for "at least 200 years". However, this has been doubted by Seigneur Michael Beaumont who wrote later: ''"Who designed it when I have no idea but I would guess it was at the instigation of my grandmother, Dame Sybil Hathaway, sometime between the wars".''

In 1970, Dame Sybil wrote to the Flag Institute and confirmed that the flag, originally intended as a personal banner, was the flag of Sark. When she died, it was draped over her coffin.

In 1987, when Sark was invited to participate in Island Games, it was noted the island had no individual flag to represent it. Accordingly, Seigneur Beaumont granted permission for the Seigneur's flag to be used as the de facto flag of Sark. Beaumont later insisted it was still his personal flag but the Sark residents argued that it should be for the island. The dispute was settled in 1991 when Beaumont stated that due to it being perceived as Sark's flag then he would agree to it being accepted as such. He then chose for his personal banner a red banner with two golden lions.

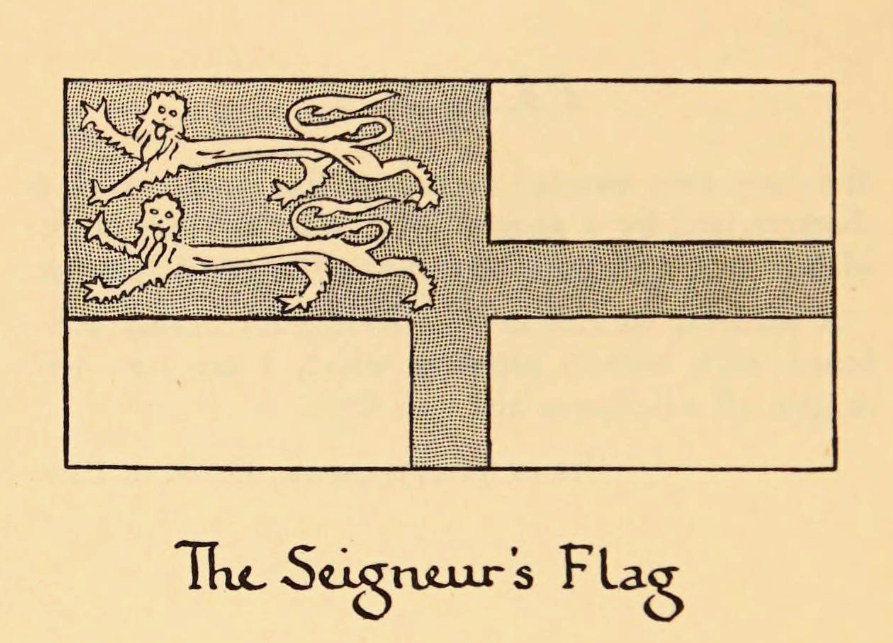
The flag in Sark Discover, foreworded by Dame Sibyl Hathaway.(1956)

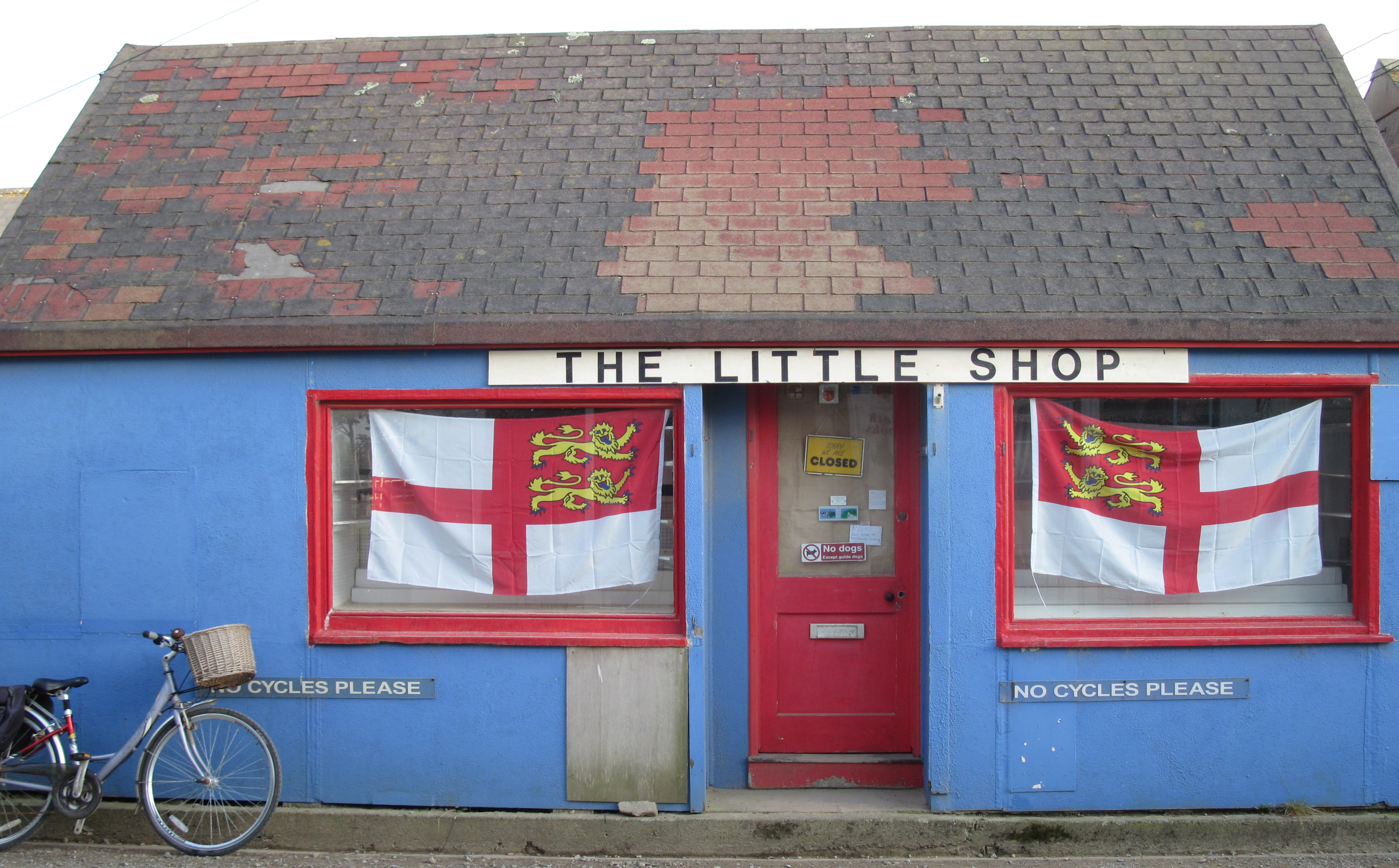
A shop in Sark (2010)

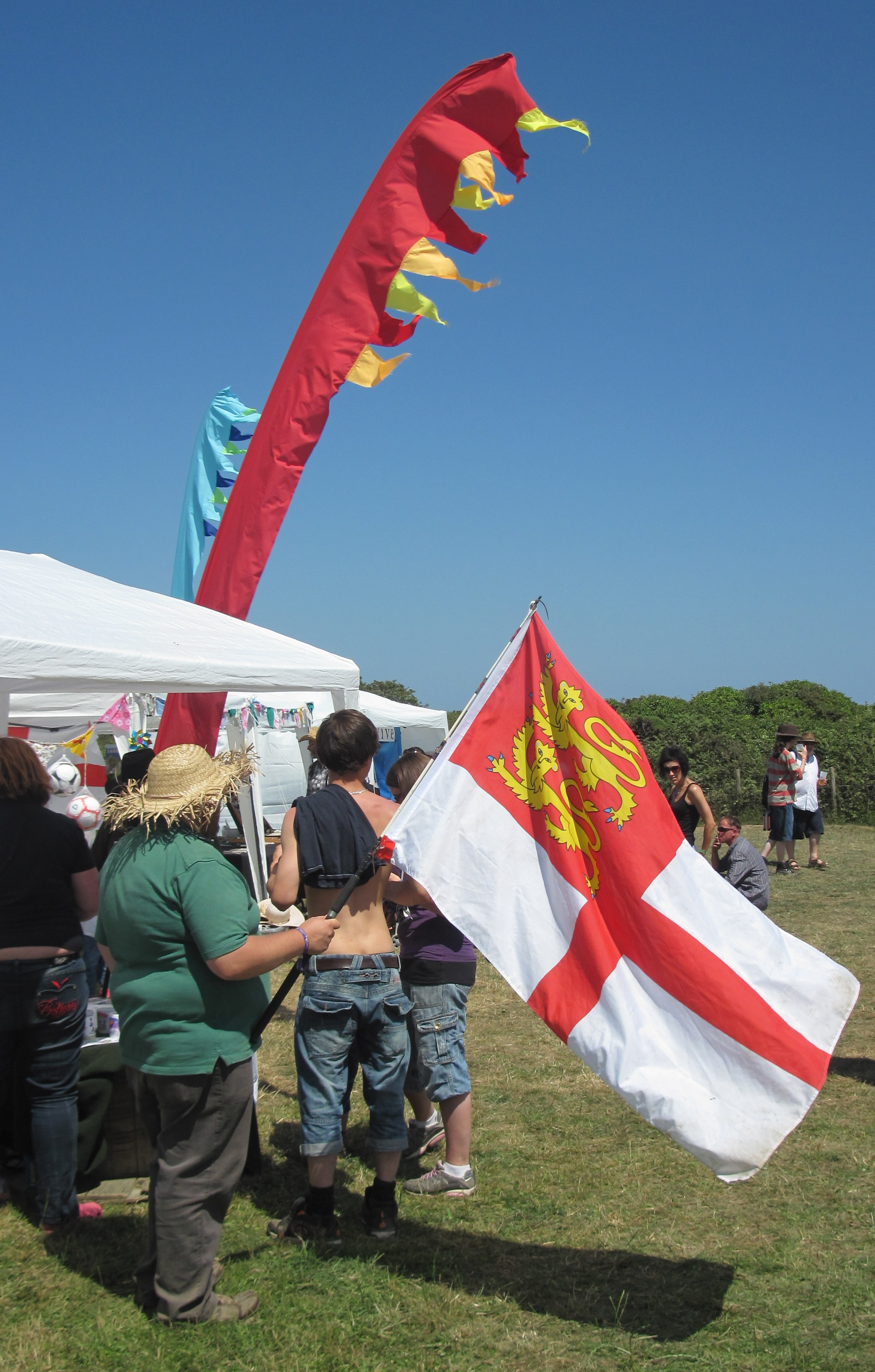
Sark Folk Festival in 2013

=== New version and official grant (2020) ===
Shortly after succeeding his father as Seigneur, Christopher Beaumont realised that the flag had not been officially endorsed by the Crown for use as flag of the island. He contacted the College of Arms to petition Queen Elizabeth II to approve a design of the flag in which the lions were only in canton. The flag was formally granted on 4 June 2020 by the Queen; this was the final grant of arms made by her before her death.

== Use outside Sark ==
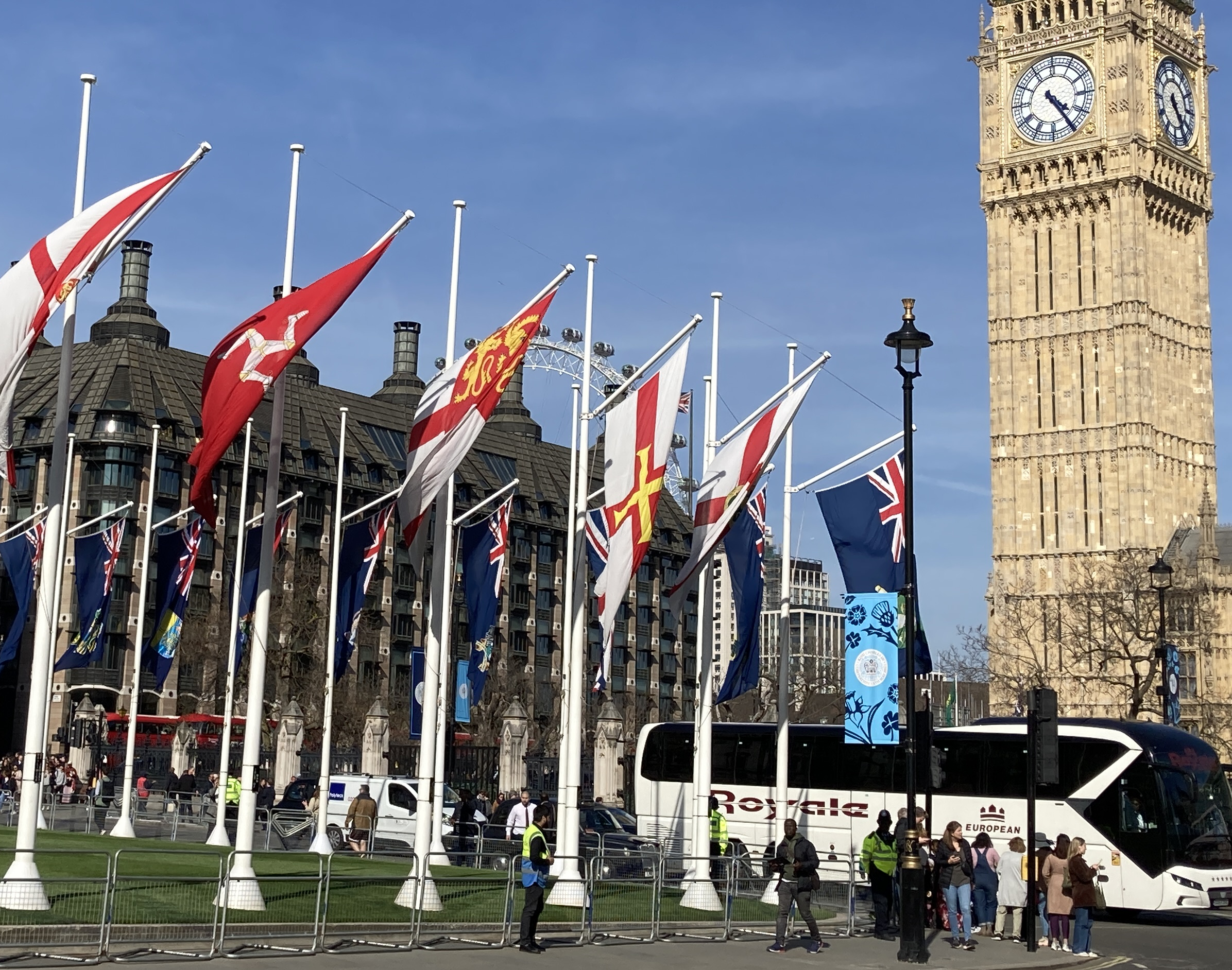
Traditional flag in Parliament Square in London (2023)

The flag of Sark is flown alongside the flags of other Crown Dependencies in Parliament Square in London.

The flag is flown from the Ministry of Justice in London on 6 August to mark the granting of the fief on that day in 1565. The Ministry of Justice is the British government department responsible for relations with the Crown Dependencies.

== Flag of Brecquou ==
Flag used by Leonard Matchan for Brecquou

In the 1960s, Dame Sibyl Hathaway sold the tenement of the island of Brecqhou to Leonard Matchan. Upon taking up the tenancy, he adopted his own flag for Brecqhou using the Seigneur's flag as the basis and sewed his own personal coat of arms onto it. In 1993, when the tenement was purchased by David and Frederick Barclay, they also adopted their own flag by using the Seigneur's flag with their coat of arms defacing it.

== In Unicode ==
The flag of Sark was approved by the Unicode Consortium for inclusion in Unicode 16.0 in 2024. The flag is implemented using the regional indicator symbol sequence CQ. The flag was included as an emoji on the Apple Color Emoji typeface in iOS 18.4.

== See also ==
- List of flags of the United Kingdom
- Flag and coat of arms of Normandy
- Flag of Guernsey
