= Dennis Sullivan (disambiguation) =

Dennis Sullivan (born 1941) is an American mathematician.

Dennis Sullivan may also refer to:

- Dennis Sullivan (cricketer) (1883–1968), English cricketer
- Dennis B. Sullivan (1927–2020), U.S. Air Force general
- Dennis Joseph Sullivan (born 1945), American prelate of the Roman Catholic Church
- Dennis Mark Sullivan (1841-1917), American businessman and politician
- Dennis Michael Sullivan, American electrical engineer
- Dennis T. Sullivan (died 1906), American Chief of the San Francisco Fire Department in 1906
- Dennis Sullivan, producer of Pork, a political talk show on the America's Talking network
- Denny Sullivan (1882–1956), American baseball center fielder
- Denny Sullivan (third baseman) (1858–1925), American baseball utility player

== See also ==
- Denis Sullivan (disambiguation)
- Dennis O'Sullivan (disambiguation)
