= Denis Sullivan =

Denis Sullivan may refer to:

- Denis Sullivan (schooner), a schooner from Milwaukee, Wisconsin, U.S.
- Denis Sullivan (shipbuilder) (died 1916), Australian shipbuilder
- Denis J. Sullivan (1889–1943), member of the Massachusetts House of Representatives
- Denis Sullivan sued Kevin Delaney, publisher of the controversial Sark Newspaper, for defamation.

== See also ==
- Dennis Sullivan (disambiguation)
