= Robert Hathaway =

Seigneur of Sark from 1929 to 1954

Seigneur of Sark

Personal details
- Born: Robert Woodward Hathaway; 20 October 1887 East Orange, New Jersey, U.S.
- Died: 15 December 1954 (aged 67) Sark
- Spouse: Sibyl Hathaway (m. 1929)
- Education: Yale University

Robert Woodward Hathaway (20 October 1887 – 15 December 1954) was jure uxoris seigneur of Sark from 1929 until his death. An American by birth, his rule spanned the reigns of four monarchs: George V, Edward VIII, George VI and Elizabeth II.

== Early life and career ==
Hathaway was born in East Orange, New Jersey, the third of four sons of the Wall Street banker Charles Hathaway and his wife Cora (née Southworth Rountree).

After graduating from Yale University, Hathaway and a number of other Yale alumni moved to Canada in order to serve in the Royal Flying Corps. He soon became a flying instructor. After the war, he took up residence in London as chief of the city's branch of the sports equipment firm Spalding, eventually becoming a naturalised British citizen.

== Rule ==
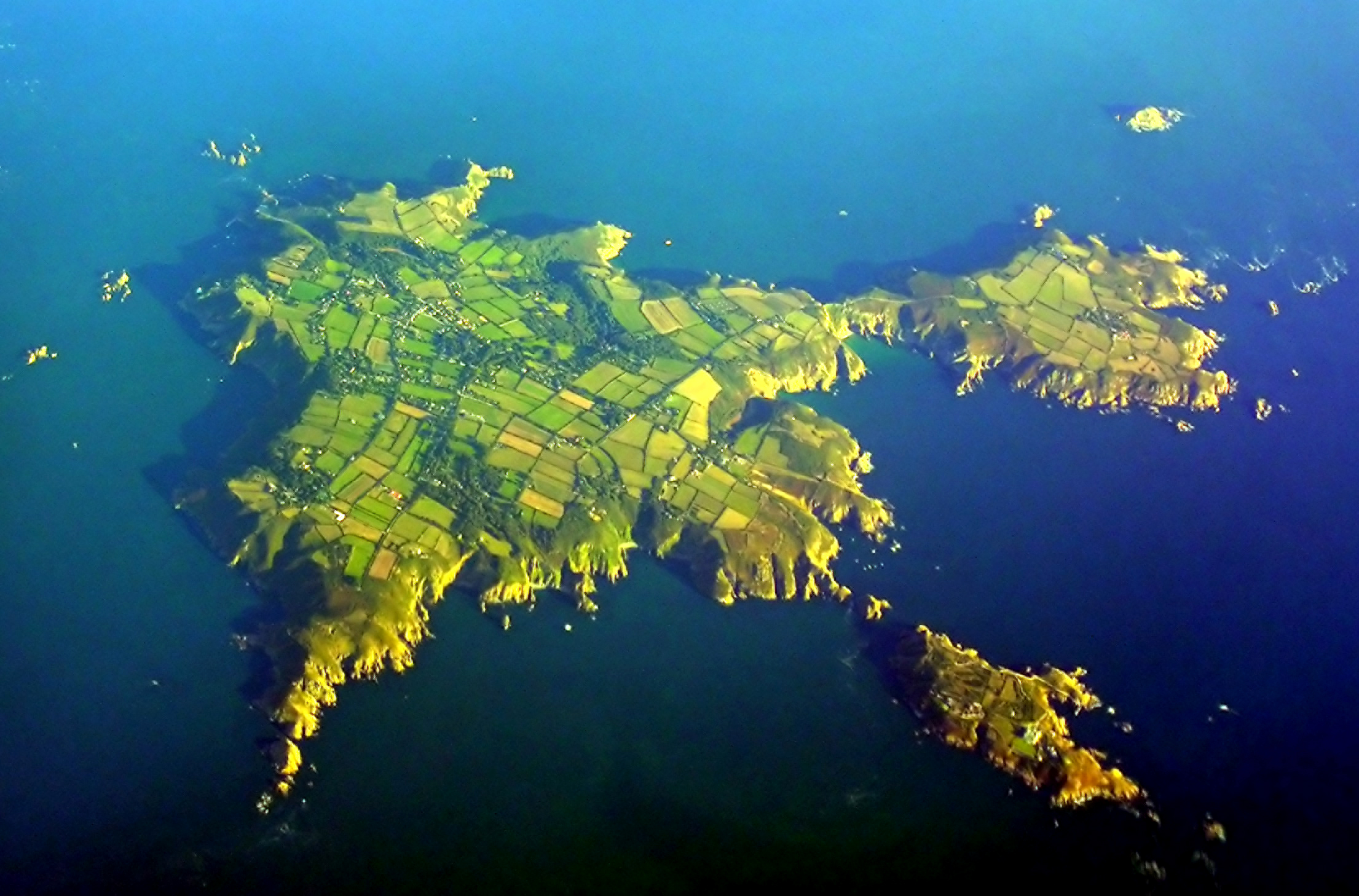
Aerial view of Sark

In 1929, Hathaway met Sibyl Beaumont, dame of Sark in the Channel Islands and the widowed mother of seven children. The couple dated for twelve days before marrying at St Marylebone Parish Church on 5 November 1929.

They immediately moved to her native island, where Hathaway was astonished to learn that, according to the feudal custom, he had become jure uxoris seigneur of the island upon their marriage. Due to her strong personality, the dame nevertheless remained the island's effective ruler and influenced Hathaway's decisions during Chief Pleas meetings. The marriage was very happy, but the "Yankee Seigneur", as he was called, was troubled by the fact that the island he ruled was not large enough for a golf course.

Shortly after the German occupation of France during World War II, Sark, too, was occupied. The Hathaways decided not to flee their territory, but allowed inhabitants to do so; the vast majority remained. The seigneur was deported to the continent and interned in Ilag VII in Laufen, which is located in Bavaria in Germany in February 1943, and remained there for the remainder of the war. His eldest stepson, the Royal Air Force officer Francis William Beaumont, was killed during the Liverpool Blitz, which left the seigneur's step-grandson, Michael Beaumont, as heir apparent.

== Death and succession ==
Hathaway died on 15 December 1954, leaving his widow as sole ruler. She ruled until her death in 1974, when her grandson succeeded her.

== See also ==
- Sark during the German occupation of the Channel Islands

Preceded by Sibyl Hathaway as sole ruler	Seigneur of Sark; 1929–1954 with Sibyl Hathaway	Succeeded by Sibyl Hathaway as sole ruler
