= William Spencer Beaumont =

British Army officer (1848-1926)

Captain William Spencer Beaumont (29 May 1848 – 2 August 1926) was a British army officer and a member of the London County Council.

Beaumont was the grandson of John Thomas Barber Beaumont, who raised the Queen Victoria's Rifles in 1803 during the Napoleonic Wars. His parents were John Augustus Beaumont and Caroline Mary Beaumont, who owned Wimbledon Park. Beaumont served as a captain in the 14th King's Hussars cavalry regiment in the British Army. In 1889 he was an elected a member of the London County Council to represent Tower Hamlets, Stepney. In 1890, Beaumont petitioned Ecclesiastical Commissioners for a Church site.

== Family ==
Beaumont married Honoria Cooper in 1876, and they had at least three children:

- Dudley John Beaumont (1877–1918); who married Sibyl Collings, later Dame of Sark. His grandson was Francis William Beaumont (1903–1941) and his great-great-grandson is the 23rd Seigneur of Sark, Christopher Beaumont.
- Norah Augusta Beaumont (1880–1961)
- Violet Rachel Beaumont (b. 1883); who married in 1903 Peter Rupert Bassett, only son of Theodore Bassett, of Hatfield, Hertfordshire.
