= Dudley Beaumont =

British Army officer and painter

Dudley John Beaumont (1877 – 24 November 1918) was a British Army officer and painter. He was the first husband of Sibyl Hathaway, 21st Seigneur of Sark, and grandfather of her successor, Michael Beaumont.

== Life ==
Beaumont was the son of William Spencer Beaumont and the great grandson of John Thomas Barber Beaumont, both British Army officers. While painting a portrait of her, Beaumont became infatuated with Sibyl Collings, the daughter of Seigneur William Frederick Collings of Sark. Despite her father's severe opposition, the couple eloped and married. Beaumont and Collings together had seven children: Bridget Amice Beaumont (1902–1948); Francis William Lionel Beaumont (1903–1941), father of John Michael Beaumont; Cyril John Astley Beaumont (1905–1973); Basil Ian Beaumont (1908–1909); Douce Alianore Daphne Beaumont (1910–1967); Richard Vyvyan Dudley Beaumont (b. 1915); Jehanne Rosemary Ernestine Beaumont (1919–88). Collings writes extensively about her relationship with Beaumont in her 1961 autobiography.

Beaumont first joined the British Army as a part-time second lieutenant in the 2nd Volunteer Battalion, Gloucestershire Regiment on 5 August 1905, but he resigned that commission on 24 March 1908. When the First World War began in 1914, Beaumont joined the 2/5 Battalion Gloucestershire Regiment,

By 25 August 1915 he was a temporary lieutenant and was transferred to the General List for service with the West African Frontier Force (WAFF). On 1 May 1916 he was transferred back to the Glosters still in the rank of temporary lieutenant but was granted seniority in that rank from 27 September 1914. He was then further transferred to a labour battalion, the 36th Battalion, Royal Fusiliers on 17 June 1916. He relinquished his commission on 19 July 1917 due to ill-health.

There is some contradiction of the official sources in family accounts: in an announcement of his son's marriage in 1924, his rank is given as captain; and his wife wrote in relation to his death that in 1918 Beaumont was deployed in France when the Spanish flu pandemic broke out and then had the misfortune of being sent to London on leave at the height of the pandemic in that city.

Beaumont died of the Spanish flu on 24 November 1918 at the age of 41. He is buried in Brookwood Cemetery in Brookwood, Surrey.
