= Dennis O'Sullivan =

Dennis O'Sullivan may refer to:

- Dennis O'Sullivan (American football) (born 1976), American football player
- Dennis O'Sullivan (Australian footballer) (1946–2018), for the Carlton Football Club
- Dennis O'Sullivan, see Roman Catholicism in Liberia

== See also ==
- Denis O'Sulivan (disambiguation)
- Dennis Sullivan (disambiguation)
