= Denis O'Sullivan =

Denis O'Sullivan may refer to:

- Denis J. O'Sullivan (1918–1987), Irish politician
- Denis O'Sullivan (golfer) (born 1948), Irish golfer
- Denis O'Sullivan (Gaelic footballer) (born 1989), Cork Gaelic footballer
- Denis O'Sullivan, Irish yachtsman, father of cabaret performer and singer Camille O'Sullivan

== See also ==
- Dennis O'Sullivan (disambiguation)
