= Francis William Beaumont =

Heir to the Seigneur of Sark, a Royal Air Force officer and film producer

Flight lieutenant Francis William Lionel Collings Beaumont
- Born: 6 August 1903; Lawshall, Suffolk, England
- Died: 5 May 1941 (aged 37); Liverpool, England
- Burial place: Liverpool, England
- Spouse: Mary Lawson
- Children: Michael Beaumont
- Relatives: Sibyl Hathaway (mother); Dudley Beaumont (father); Robert Hathaway (stepfather)
- Military career
- Branch: Royal Air Force
- Service years: 1923–1928, 1939–1941
- Rank: Flight lieutenant
- Nickname: Buster
- Conflicts: World War II
- Other work: Film producer

Francis William Lionel Collings Beaumont (6 August 1903 – 4 May 1941), also known as F. W. L. C. Beaumont or "Buster" Beaumont, was the heir to the Seigneur of Sark, a Royal Air Force officer, film producer and the husband of actress Mary Lawson. He and Lawson were killed in 1941 during the Liverpool Blitz.

== Family background ==
Francis William Beaumont was born on 6 August 1903 at Lawshall in Suffolk. He was the second child of Dudley and Sibyl Beaumont, daughter of William Frederick Collings, who ruled the island of Sark as seigneur (feudal lord). Sark is a self-governing territory in the Bailiwick of Guernsey, a British Crown Dependency in the English Channel off the coast of Normandy. The island has been called one of the last feudal outposts in Western Europe, a term used by Beaumont's mother to describe the island's political system. Beaumont was named after his grandfather, William Frederick Collings, the 20th Seigneur of Sark, but was often called by his nickname, Buster. On his father's side of the family, Beaumont descended from a line of notable British Army officers. His father served in France during the First World War and died in 1918 during the Spanish flu pandemic. His grandfather, William Spencer Beaumont, was a captain in the 14th King's Hussars cavalry regiment, while his great-great-grandfather, John Thomas Barber Beaumont, was a well known miniature painter who in 1803, during the Napoleonic Wars, raised a corps of Riflemen, The Duke of Cumberland's Sharp Shooters.

In 1927, Beaumont's grandfather died and his mother inherited the fief. As the oldest son, Beaumont was the heir apparent to the seigneurship.

== Education and early military career ==
Beaumont was educated at Elizabeth College, in St Peter Port, Guernsey. Beaumont's mother wanted her son to study at the Royal Air Force College at Cranwell, but she faced financial difficulties following her husband's death. She was forced to sell her farm on Sark and relocate to Guernsey and then Cologne, Germany, in order to support her family. While still a cadet, Beaumont became an able pilot and participated in an RAF aerial show at Hendon. In December 1923 Beaumont graduated from Cranwell, was commissioned as a pilot officer on 19 December, and posted to No. 207 Squadron at Eastchurch; on 19 June 1925 he was promoted to flying officer. While serving Beaumont accumulated personal financial debts that threatened to end his career. His mother intervened with contacts in the RAF and pleaded for her son to be deployed abroad where he would be "away from the crowd of young irresponsibles he is running around with." In November 1925 Beaumont was assigned to No. 45 Squadron in Iraq, where the British had established the Mandate of Mesopotamia. In 1928 Beaumont was assigned to the RAF depot at Uxbridge near London, and resigned his commission in the RAF on 3 October 1928.

== Marriages ==
In 1924, while serving in the RAF, it was announced that Beaumont was engaged to Enid Corinne Ripley of Outwood, Surrey, and in October 1926 the couple were married in London. In December 1927, Enid Beaumont gave birth to a son, John Michael Beaumont, who would become the 22nd Seigneur of Sark in 1974.

Beaumont met his second wife, actress Mary Lawson, while producing the 1936 film Toilers of the Sea, an adaption of Victor Hugo's 1866 novel Les Travailleurs de la mer. Hugo's book is set in Guernsey and Beaumont's mother writes in her 1961 autobiography that scenes from the film were shot on Sark and that her son provided backing for the film, along with French director/producer Jean Choux; in the film credits the production company L. C. Beaumont is mentioned, but not Choux. At this time Beaumont was still married to his first wife. It is uncertain when the affair between Lawson and Beaumont began, but Beaumont's wife purchased an announcement in the 30 November 1937 edition of The Times asking for a "dissolution" of their marriage "on the ground of his adultery with Miss Mary Lawson." That year the Beaumonts were divorced, and on 22 June 1938 Beaumont and Lawson were married in Chelsea. In her memoirs, Beaumont's mother makes no mention of her son's second wife, rather she praises his first wife as a "charming girl". Upon marriage Lawson legally changed her name to Mary Elizabeth Beaumont, but she continued to use Mary Lawson as her stage name.

== Fascist connection and World War II ==
In 1937 Beaumont reportedly met with Oswald Mosley, founder of the British Union of Fascists, to discuss the opening of a private radio broadcast station on Sark. In the 1930s, the British Broadcasting Corporation had a government sanctioned monopoly in Britain on broadcasting television and radio and private commercial broadcasts funded by advertisers were illegal. Mosley wanted to challenge this monopoly in order to raise funds for his fledgling party by setting up broadcast stations outside of the BBC's jurisdiction. Mosley and Beaumont reportedly came to an agreement for a thirty-year lease to set up a Radio Sark broadcast station on the island. There have been claims that Beaumont was sympathetic to the Mosley's movement and that he and Mosley were amiable. Beaumont is also reported to have hidden the source of the funding of the radio station from his mother in order to obtain her approval. In addition, British government documents opened to the public in the 1990s reveal that Mosley sought funding from the German Nazi government for Radio Sark, though Beaumont is not implicated in these dealings.

Despite his connections with British fascists, Beaumont promptly rejoined the RAF at the outset of the Second World War in 1939; he was recommissioned as a pilot officer on probation on 26 September, and on 1 June 1940 he was promoted to war substantive flying officer. He seems later to have been promoted flight lieutenant. He was assigned to the Administrative and Special Duties Branch, which includes the RAF's intelligence section.

During the war the Channel Islands were occupied by German forces and contact was severed between Beaumont and his relatives on Sark, including his mother, who remained on the island for the duration of the war.

== Death ==
In May 1941 Beaumont received a week's leave and he, Lawson, friends and family travelled to Liverpool, where they stayed at a hotel at 74 Bedford Rd, Toxteth. On 1 May the German Luftwaffe began a bombing campaign on Liverpool that would last more than a week. On 4 May, as the warning sirens went off, family and friends at the hotel, including Lawson's sister Dorothy, took safety in a shelter, while Lawson and Beaumont stayed in their room. The hotel was destroyed, injuring the couple who later died at the Royal Southern Hospital, Smithdown Rd, Liverpool, while all those who sought safety in the shelter survived. The death of Beaumont and Lawson was announced in newspapers around the globe, but news of Beaumont's death was slow to reach Sark because of the German occupation. Beaumont's elder sister, Amice, who was in England at the time, contacted the embassy of the United States of America, which had yet to enter the war, and asked them to convey the news of her brother's passing to German authorities. Beaumont's mother was notified of her son's death by the German Commandant in Guernsey, Colonel Rudolf Graf von Schmettow, who conveyed the news in a manner that she described as "gently as possible."

Beaumont and Lawson are buried in Kirkdale Cemetery, Liverpool. A memorial plaque with names of Beaumont and other former pupils of Elizabeth College that fell during the Second World War is located on the school grounds in Guernsey.
