= John Thomas Barber Beaumont =

English painter

John Thomas Barber Beaumont (1774–1841) was a British army officer, painter, author, and philanthropist. He was successful in the insurance business, and projected a settlement in South America.

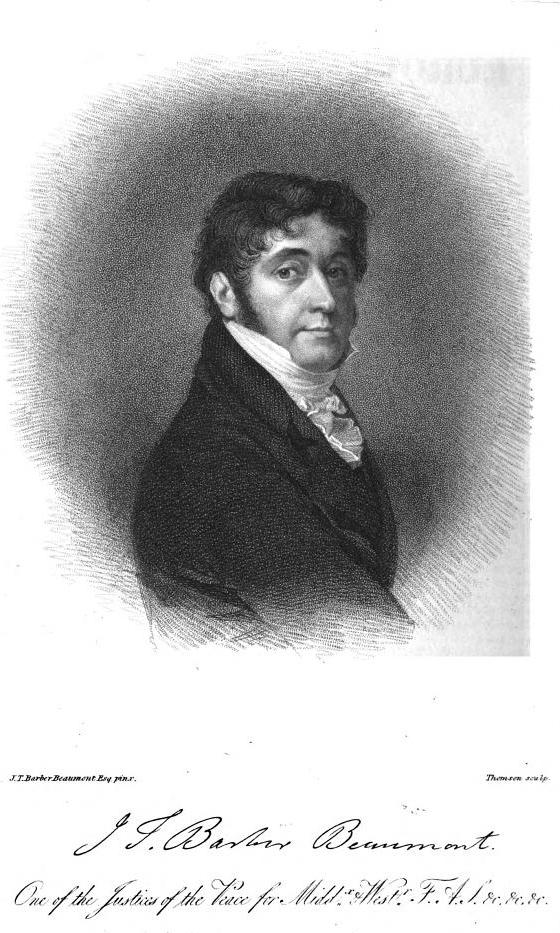
John Thomas Barber Beaumont, 1822 engraving.

== Life ==
Born John Thomas Barber on 21 December 1774 in the parish of St Marylebone, London, he assumed in 1812, for unknown reasons, the additional name of Beaumont (which was retained by his descendants) and was often known as "Barber Beaumont".

=== Artist ===
An accomplished painter, Barber Beaumont focused on history painting and miniature painting. He had his works displayed at the Royal Academy of Arts in London and was appointed miniature painter to the Duke of Clarence, the future king William IV of Great Britain. His pupils included Henry Thomas Alken.

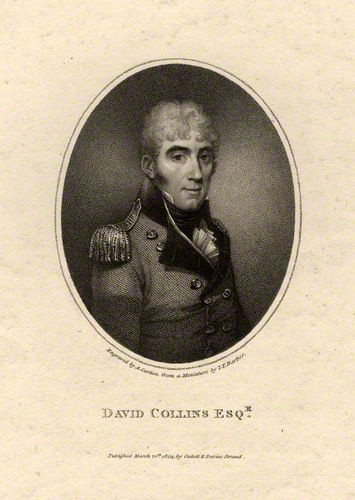
Engraving of David Collins by Anthony Cardon, from a miniature by John Thomas Barber.

=== Rifle corps ===
In 1803, when Napoleon threatened to invade England, Beaumont raised a rifle corps named The Duke of Cumberland's Sharp Shooters. His troops were reported to be such accurate shots that on one occasion he held a target in Hyde Park, London while the corps fired at it from a distance of 150 yards. In 1835 the corps changed its name to Royal Victoria Rifle Club and then later became Queen Victoria's Rifles.

=== In business ===
Beaumont established in 1806 the Provident Institution and Savings Bank in Covent Garden. In 1807 he founded the County Fire Office and the Provident Life insurance office. In 1816–8 he took on Thomas Bignold of Norwich Union in a costly publicity war. Beaumont was a supporter of Caroline of Brunswick in her long-running dispute with George IV, and had the County Fire office in Regent Street decorated with lamps to celebrate her tactical victory over the royal divorce bill in 1820. He resisted a fraudulent claim made on the fire company in 1823 by Thomas Thurtell, and ultimately secured the committal of Thurtell and associates to Newgate Prison. John Thurtell, the brother of Thomas, took up the quarrel, and made an attempt to murder Beaumont, which failed. Beaumont also took an active part in the exposure of a fraudulent insurance office, the West Middlesex, writing a letter to The Times about it in 1839.

Beaumont, an investor in South America and supporter of its independence from colonial rule, knew Bernardino Rivadavia, during his stay in London, and set up the Rio de La Plata Agricultural Association, with shares held also by Rudolph Ackermann. In 1825 British emigrants sailed to what is now Argentina, settling at Entre Ríos and San Pedro. The Cisplatine War, between the United Provinces of the Río de la Plata and the Empire of Brazil, intervened to make further settlement and even communication difficult. The troubled affairs of the intended colony were described in an 1828 book Travels in Buenos Ayres written by John Augustus Barber Beaumont, son of Barber Beaumont, who had tried to help the remaining colonists.

In 1825 Beaumont fought against the Board of Stamps, which charged his company with defrauding the Inland Revenue, and came off victorious. In 1835 he founded the Provident Institution or Bank for Savings in London's Covent Garden district.

=== Death ===
Beaumont was a Fellow of the Society of Antiquaries of London, and of the Geological Society. He died on 15 May 1841 at his residence in Regent Street.

== Works ==
In 1802 Beaumont published an illustrated Tour throughout South Wales and Monmouthshire. In 1803 he wrote articles on sharpshooters and defence; and set up a periodical, the Weekly Register.

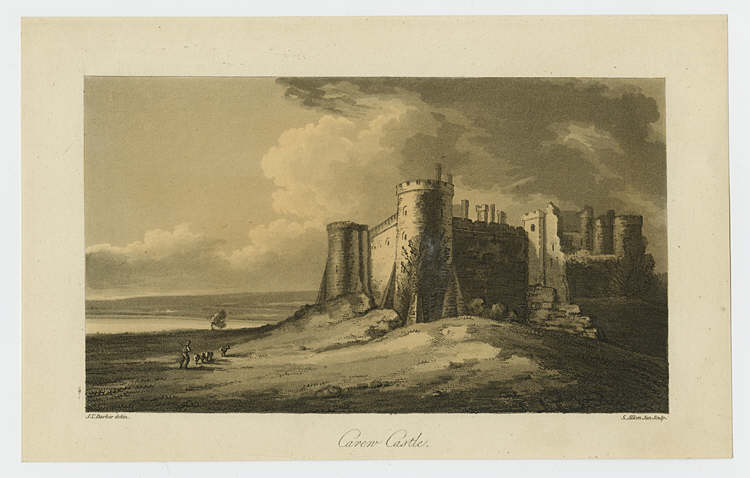
Carew Castle, engraving by Samuel Alken after John Thomas Barber.

In 1816 he published an essay on Provident or Parish Banks; and in 1821 an Essay on Criminal Jurisprudence.

== Legacy ==
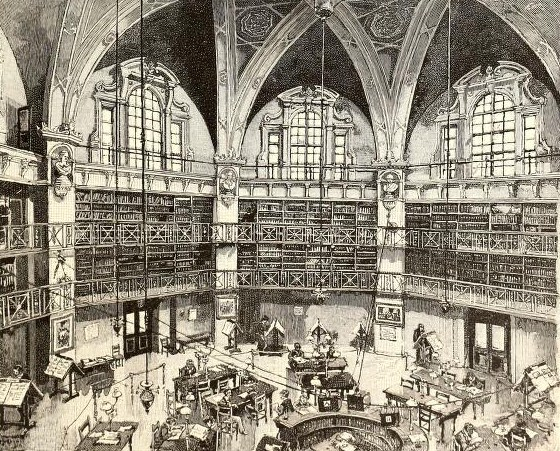
Reading Room at the People's Palace, 1890 magazine illustration. It was based on the Prior's Kitchen of Durham Cathedral.

In 1839–40 Beaumont founded the Beaumont Philosophical Institution, in Beaumont Square in Mile End, E1, in London's Borough of Tower Hamlets. The Square was part of the Beaumont Estate, a housing development, and the Institution was on the north-west corner of the square. It was created for the welfare and entertainment of people in the neighbourhood. The opening was on 29 October 1840, with a temperance meeting led by Philip Henry Stanhope, 4th Earl Stanhope. The Institution comprised a museum, reading-room, and chapel. When Beaumont died in 1841 he left £13,000 for the maintenance of the institute. In 1844 the museum offered geology, mineralogy, and conchology, and there were singing classes and concerts. Initially the chapel was used for broad-minded services, where the ministers were Philip Harwood, and Thomas Wood of the Brixton Unitarian congregation, and using a liturgy by Robert Fellowes. By 1851 the "moral lectures" required by the founder for Sunday mornings had been transferred to weekday evenings, and the income of £400 per annum went mainly on concerts.

The Institution was administered by the Beaumont Trust: the initial trustees were Fellowes with Henry Churchill, John Elliotson, Alexander Henderson, Charles Hennell, and Henry B. Kerr. In its original form it closed down in 1879. Its successor, the People's Palace, was opened in 1887; it was built by the Trust on the Mile End Road site of the old Bancroft's School, under the influence of Walter Besant, and to a design by Edward Robert Robson. It later came under the control of East London College. In 1931 fire damage necessitated the construction of the New People's Palace on an adjacent site; it was opened in 1937. Part of the original construction survives as the Queens' Building.

In the longer term the Institution was one of the organisations leading up to the founding of Queen Mary, University of London, which now has a Barber Beaumont Chair of Humanities, currently occupied by Quentin Skinner.

== Family ==
Beaumont's descendants include the ruling family of Sark. One of Beaumont's grandsons was William Spencer Beaumont, who served in the 14th King's Hussars. In 1887 he published a private account of his grandfather's life, A Brief Account of the Beaumont Trust, and its founder, J. T. B. Beaumont. Beaumont's great grandson was Dudley Beaumont, who married Sibyl Collings, later Dame of Sark. Beaumont's great-great-great grandson is Christopher Beaumont, the 23rd Seigneur of Sark.
