= Queens' Building =

Building in Mile End, London

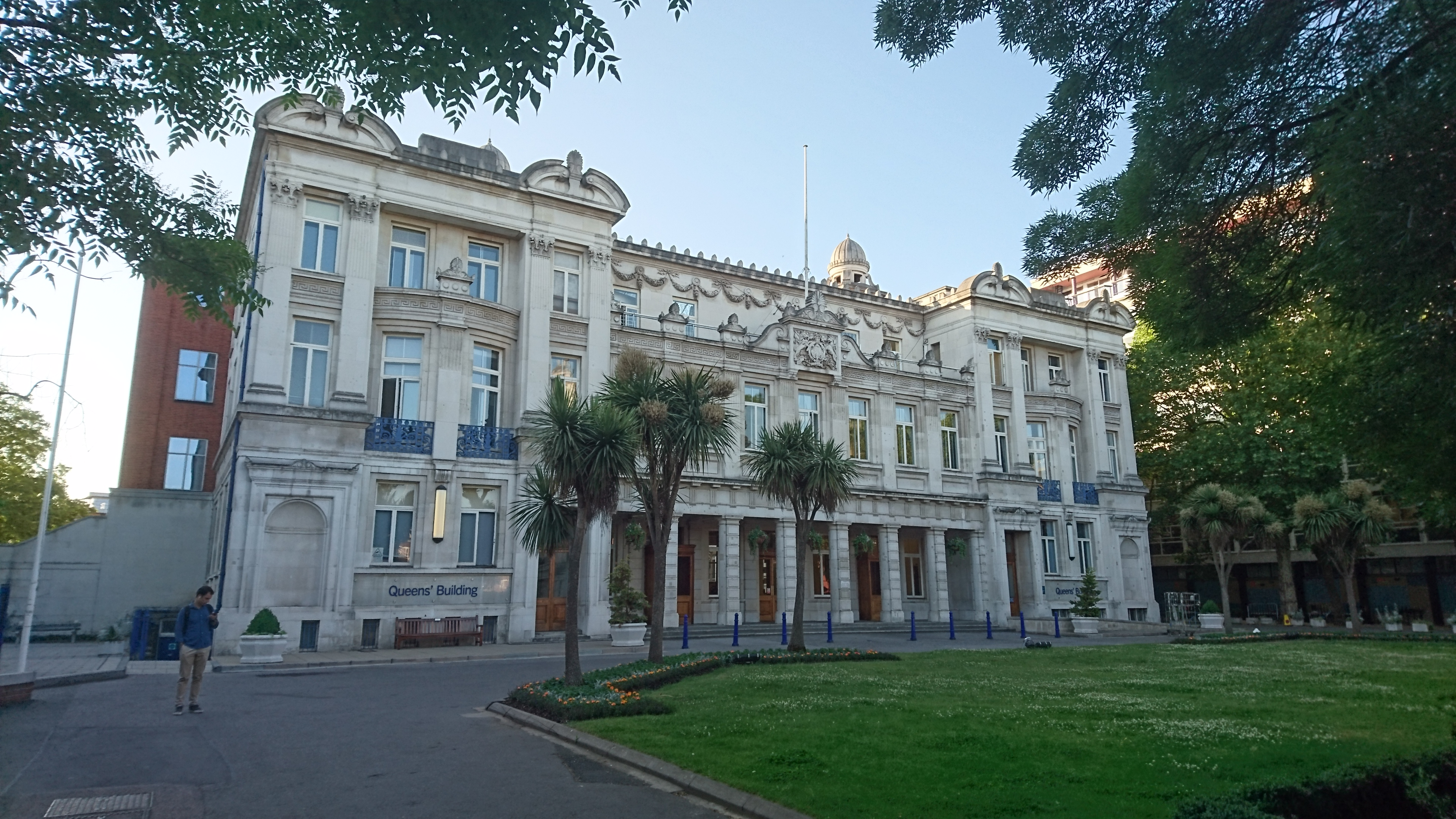
- The Queens' Building in 2018
- Interactive map of the Queens' Building area

General information
- Location: Mile End, London, England
- Coordinates: 51.5233°N 0.0404°W
- Opened: 14 May 1887

Design and construction
- Architect: Edward Robert Robson

The Queens' Building is a Grade II listed building in Mile End in the London Borough of Tower Hamlets. Originally opened in 1887 as an educational and cultural venue for the East End of London, known as the People's Palace, it now serves as one of the main buildings of Queen Mary University of London.

== History ==
The first section of the Queens' Building, then known as the People's Palace, was opened by Queen Victoria on 14 May 1887. Much of the initial funding for the construction of the building was provided by John Thomas Barber Beaumont, who, following his death in 1840, had left a sum of money to be used to promote the education and entertainment of the people in the vicinity of the nearby Beaumont Square. It included a large concert hall called the Queen's Hall, a library, now known as the Octagon, a gymnasium, swimming pool, garden and tennis court.

The Hall was used for a variety of events, including lectures, concerts and organ recitals, shows of birds and flowers, exhibitions of animals and pictures, fetes and more. The Palace Journals (1887-1895) provide a rich account of the early years of the People’s Palace and a valuable insight into Victorian culture and social history. The technical and trade school which formed part of the People's Palace later developed into Queen Mary College.

A large section of the building, including the Queen's Hall, was completely destroyed by a fire on 26 February 1931. It was rebuilt in the following years, with a much greater focus on education, including lecture theatres and laboratories, and was incorporated as Queen Mary College on 12 December 1934.

The People's Palace itself was rebuilt as a new building located to adjacent to the current Queens' Building, and continued on as a theatre, cinema and music hall for a number of years, until revenues declined and it was purchased by the college in 1954.
