= Sibyl Hathaway =

Dame of Sark from 1927 to 1974

Dame Sibyl Hathaway DBE
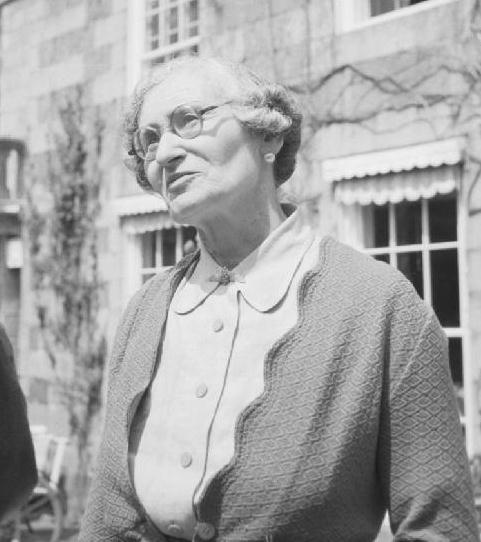
- Hathaway in May 1945

Dame of Sark
- In office 20 June 1927 – 14 July 1974
- Preceded by: William Frederick Collings
- Succeeded by: Michael Beaumont

Personal details
- Born: Sibyl Mary Collings; 13 January 1884 Guernsey, Channel Islands
- Died: 14 July 1974 (aged 90) Sark, Channel Islands
- Spouses: Dudley Beaumont (m. 1901; died 1918) Robert Hathaway (m. 1929; died 1954)
- Children: 8 (including Francis William Beaumont)
- Parent(s): William Frederick Collings; Sophie Moffatt

Dame Sibyl Mary Hathaway (née Collings, formerly Beaumont; 13 January 1884 – 14 July 1974) was Dame of Sark from 1927 until her death in 1974. Her 47-year rule over Sark, in the Channel Islands, spanned the reigns of four monarchs: George V, Edward VIII, George VI and Elizabeth II.

Hathaway was the daughter of the eccentric seigneur of Sark, William Frederick Collings. Sibyl learned French, Sercquiais, Norman and German prior to becoming feudal lady of Sark. She married Dudley Beaumont in 1901, and they had seven children. One of her children died in infancy, and her husband died from Spanish flu in 1918, leaving her a financially troubled widow. She succeeded her father in 1927, and immediately set about reinforcing her feudal rights and promoting tourism on the island, which she affectionately called "the last bastion of feudalism". When she remarried in 1929, her second husband, Robert Hathaway, legally became her senior co-ruler, but she kept control of the government.

Dame Sibyl's tenure saw the German occupation of the Channel Islands in the Second World War, during which she refused to evacuate and convinced the islanders to stay as well. Her eldest son and heir apparent, Francis William Beaumont, was killed in 1941, while her husband was deported to an internment camp in 1943. The Dame remains best known for her indomitable conduct during the occupation. After the war, she continued her publicity campaign, strengthening the island's tourism industry.

Having been widowed again in 1954, she went on to rule alone, and was made Dame Commander of the Order of the British Empire in 1965. She was described by a British government official as a "lady of unusual personality", and is often referred to as a benevolent dictator. Dame Sibyl died at the age of 90, and was succeeded by her grandson, Michael Beaumont.

== Early life ==
Sibyl Mary Collings was born in Guernsey in a house that once belonged to John Allaire, her privateering great-great-grandfather, whose business dealings brought the fief of Sark to his daughter, Marie Collings. Her parents were William Frederick Collings and his Montreal-born wife Sophie (née Moffatt). Collings was born two years after her notoriously intemperate father inherited the fief from his father, William Thomas Collings. She had one sibling, a sister named Doris.

Collings, heir presumptive to Sark, was treated by her father as if she were a boy. She was lame due to unequal leg length, but that did not prevent him from insisting on teaching her to shoot, sail, and climb cliffs. He never allowed his daughters to complain of pain or sadness, and his successor was later grateful for "being able to live a life free of the inconvenience of self-pity". As the future ruler of an island situated between France and the United Kingdom, she learned standard French and the local Sercquiais dialect of the Norman language.

== First marriage ==
At the age of 15, Sybil fell in love with Dudley Beaumont, a British painter who could neither shoot nor climb cliffs, and who her father therefore considered a "weakling". Her father made it clear that he was adamantly opposed to the relationship, but Sibyl continued to see Beaumont. By 1901, after a raging argument, her father dragged Sybil out of her bedroom at midnight and threw her out of the seigneurial residence barefoot and in a nightgown. Sybil remained among the hedges of the garden until Beaumont, alerted by her mother (in an age before the telephone), found her before dawn. Her father regretted his action almost immediately, and searched the island for her the next morning, but she had resolved to leave. She boarded a boat for the neighbouring island of Guernsey. When the Seigneur stormed aboard looking for her, she was hidden by the captain. From Guernsey, she travelled to the house of a relative in London. Beaumont soon married her at St James's Church, Piccadilly.

Sibyl Beaumont had no contact with her father for the next year, until the birth of her first child, Bridget (1902–1948). Wanting to be reconciled with his daughter, her father sent her a telegram of congratulation, which contained words of consolation as well, as the child was female: "Sorry it was a vixen." Sybil went on to have six children more: four sons – Francis William Lionel, Cyril John Astley, Basil Ian (died in infancy) and Richard Vyvyan Dudley, and two more daughters – Douce Alianore Daphne and Jehanne Rosemary Ernestine (stillbirth). The family moved to Sark in 1912, a few years after her mother's death.

In her 1961 autobiography, Sybil wrote extensively about her relationship with her first husband. Dudley Beaumont, who served in the British Army as an officer during the First World War, died on 24 November 1918 during the Spanish flu pandemic. His death left her a pregnant widow with precarious finances. Neither her father nor her father-in-law, the army officer William Spencer Beaumont, were willing to give financial support to the widow and her six surviving children. She learned German and started working for the YMCA in Cologne. She also worked for the British Army of the Rhine and raised prize cattle.

== Accession and remarriage ==
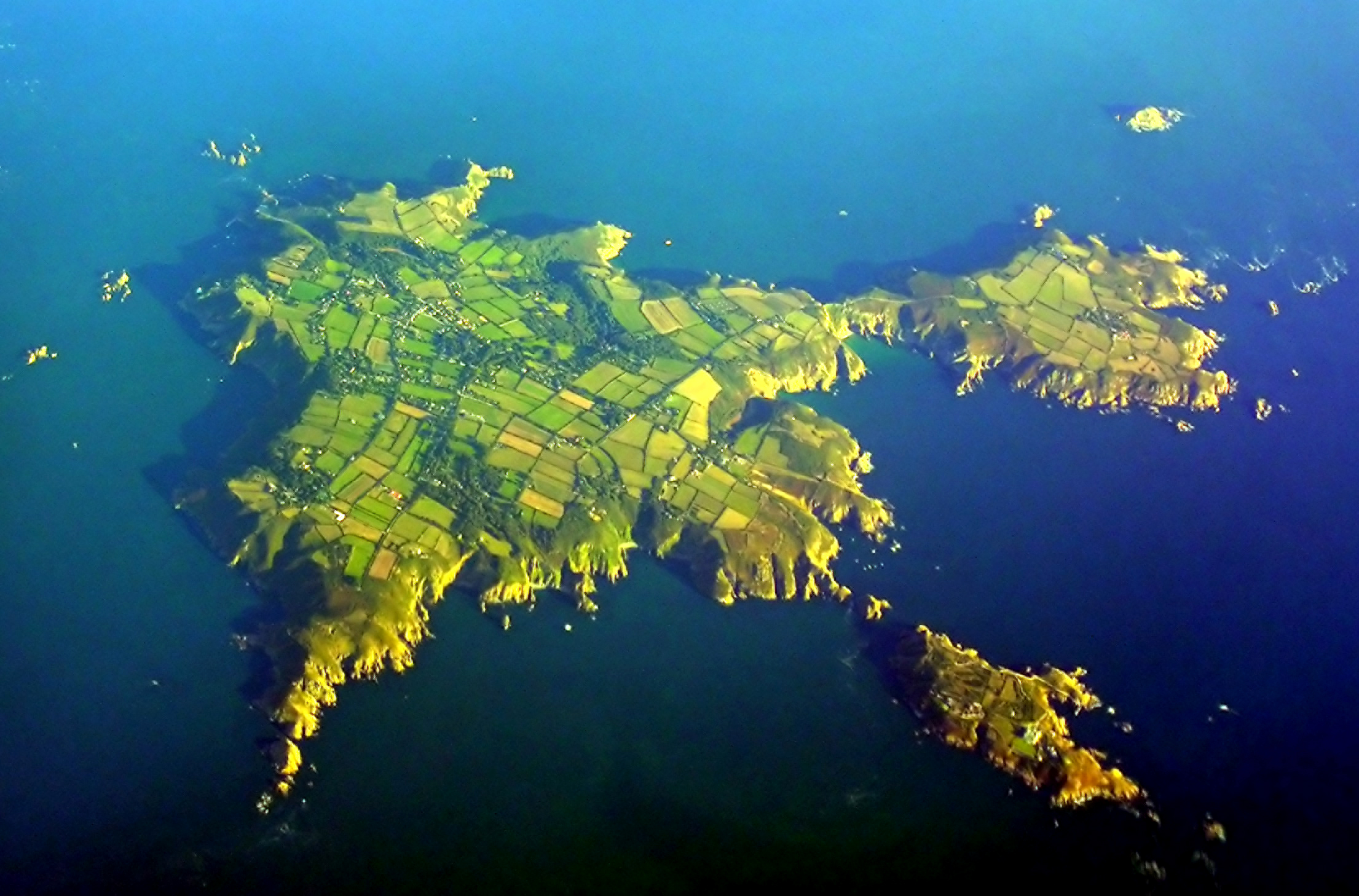
Aerial view of Sark

William Frederick Collings died on 20 June 1927, and was succeeded by his widowed daughter. Towards the end of his life, he stopped requesting from the inhabitants the payment of tithes, wheat and poulage (a feudal tax of two chickens). Upon her accession, the new dame immediately reasserted her feudal rights, and even noted: "They always give me the skinniest and oldest [chickens]".

Some islanders complained about Sark being the last remnant of feudalism in Europe, but the Dame maintained that agriculture had to be encouraged to make the island more self-sufficient. She used the island's unique feudal system to draw tourists, and refused to allow anything to deter them by ruining its peacefulness. She thus banned motor vehicles and holiday camps, but the Chief Pleas refused to pass an ordinance that would have forbidden selling alcohol to anyone known to get drunk. Like her eldest son Francis, heir apparent to the seigneurship, she was fascinated by film production. While Appointment with Venus was being shot on Sark in 1951, the Dame even deigned to allow a car ashore, ostensibly believing that "a Land Rover was some sort of senior Boy Scout".

In autumn 1929, the Dame was on her way to a holiday in the United States when she met Robert Hathaway, an American-born former army aviator. On 5 November, following her return from the United States and a twelve-day-long courtship, they married at St Marylebone Parish Church. Robert was not aware that the marriage made him jure uxoris seigneur of Sark, his wife's co-ruler, until they set foot on the island. Hathaway's strong personality, however, ensured that she had the final say in the matters of government; while her husband attended government meetings as seigneur, she accompanied him to "give advice". Lecture tours in the United States, aided by her second husband's connections, were part of her efforts to promote tourism and bring more revenue to the island.

== Second World War ==
Hathaway's tenure as seigneur was interrupted by the German occupation of the Channel Islands in the Second World War from 3 July 1940 until 8 May 1945. While some inhabitants of other Channel Islands were evacuated, Hathaway declared that she would not leave her island, and prevailed upon all native-born islanders to remain as well.

Most of her tenants bitterly resented her for the decision to remain on Sark during the ensuing five years of occupation, but thanked her after the war when they saw how total evacuation destroyed the neighbouring island of Alderney. The Dame had her senior official meet German officers at the harbour and escort them to her residence, where her maid announced them as if they were guests.

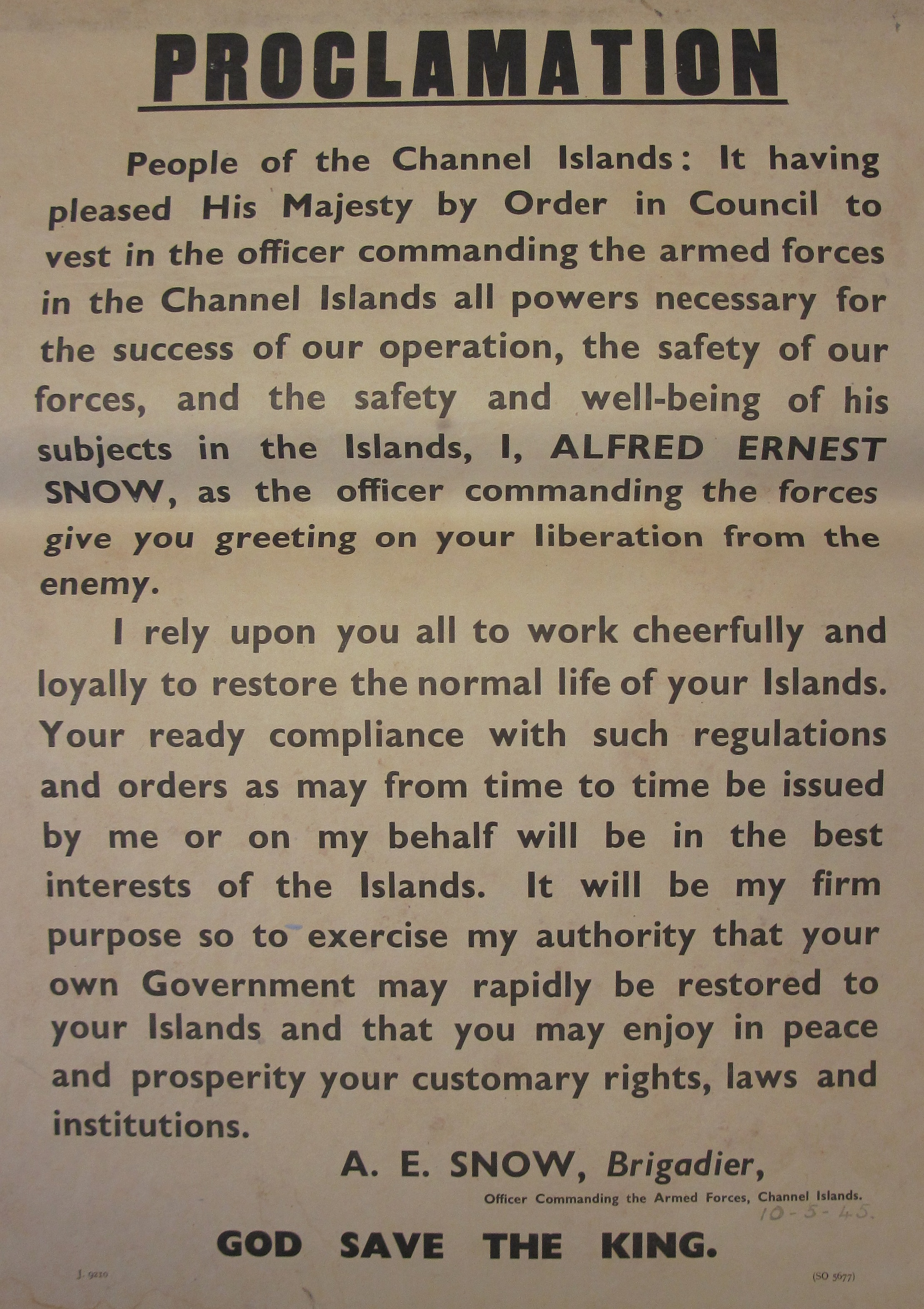
Proclamation of liberation of the Channel Islands

Hathaway was much respected by the islanders as well as by the Germans, whose language she spoke perfectly, for the leadership she gave during this period, and the British Home Secretary Herbert Morrison observed that she remained "almost wholly mistress of the situation" throughout the occupation. Hathaway was on friendly terms with Eugen Fürst zu Oettingen-Wallerstein, the German commander stationed in Guernsey, as indicated by their warm correspondence.

Many other German officers in charge of the Channel Islands were also of noble extraction, and Hathaway exploited their "stiff German formality" by making it clear that she "expected to be treated ... with the rigid etiquette to which they were accustomed in their own country." She insisted that officers come to her rather than the other way around, and expected them to bow, kiss her hand, and bow again before she allowed them to take a seat. Using her influence with the Prince of Oettingen-Wallerstein, she was able to get the German army physician stationed in Sark to treat her sick tenants. When Germans ordered that all the Sarkese be instructed in German, the Dame offered a room in her residence as a classroom for the children of the island.

Hathaway's eldest son Francis and his second wife, the screen actress Mary Lawson, were killed during the Liverpool Blitz; his son Michael became first in line to inherit the island. Her husband was deported to Ilag VII in Laufen in Bavaria in February 1943, where he remained for the rest of the war. He did not sign any document delegating his seigneurial authority, which meant that legality of ordinances issued by Hathaway during this period was, at best, questionable. She refused to sign orders issued by Germans, arguing that they were simply not hers to sign. She was insulted by an order that prohibited sexual relations between her tenants and German troops on the grounds of venereal disease outbreak, since the order implied that Sarkese women consorted with Germans.

According to British historian David Fraser, Sibyl did not raise her objection to a series of antisemitic orders that had been previously issued by the German authorities, which concerned among others her Czech Jewish friend Annie Wranowsky.

Islanders suffered shortage of food in the last months of the occupation. Hathaway organised a raid on German grain stocks and saved many families from starvation with her secret potato hoard. Sark was liberated on 10 May 1945. Three British officers arrived and, explaining that no British troops were available, asked the Dame to take command of 275 men belonging to the defeated German garrison. She made sure the garrison cleared up the island of land mines. She was, however, so concerned about the legal status of the decisions she had issued during the war that she sailed to Guernsey to validate them as soon as the island was liberated. Her experience of the German occupation inspired William Douglas-Home's play The Dame of Sark. Hathaway's manner of receiving Germans has been described as both impressive and overly cordial. She felt there was nothing to be gained by being rude to them.

== Postwar years ==
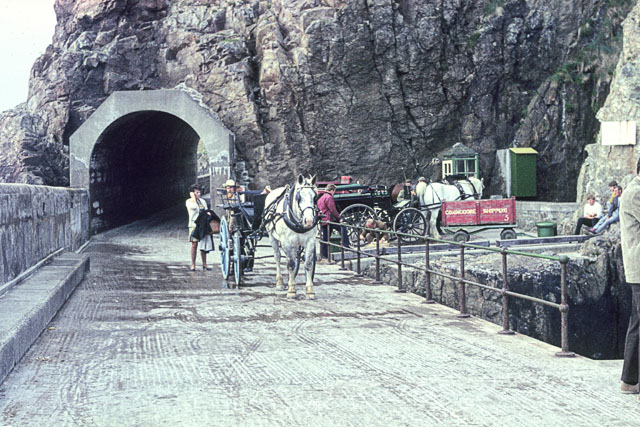
The Maseline Harbour, regarded by Hathaway as a great success, photographed in 1968

Following the war, Hathaway continued to promote Sark's tourist trade and advocated building a new harbour. In 1949, she and her husband welcomed Princess Elizabeth, Duchess of Edinburgh (later Queen Elizabeth II) and the Duke of Edinburgh, who opened the new harbour. The same year, Hathaway became Officer of the Order of the British Empire.

Sibyl and Robert Hathaway's happy marriage ended with his death in 1954, six years after the death of her eldest child, Bridget. Hathaway, a widow once again, regained her complete authority over the island. In 1957, Queen Elizabeth II and the Duke of Edinburgh returned to Sark; this was the first time a reigning monarch had ever come to the island.

Hathaway rendered homage to the Queen on that occasion – the first time that ceremony was performed on Sark itself. Her autobiography, Dame of Sark, was published in 1961.

On the 400th anniversary of Queen Elizabeth I's grant of charter signed in 1565 to Sark's first seigneur, Hellier de Carteret, Hathaway was made Dame Commander of the Order of the British Empire at Buckingham Palace. She then jokingly referred to herself as a "double dame". However, soon after her quatercentenary, her daughter, Douce Briscoe, died in 1967, having struggled with alcoholism for a long time.

In 1969, Hathaway became increasingly worried by the Royal Commission on the Constitution's intrusion into her affairs. At the same time, she had a sharp dispute with the Chief Pleas, claiming that its members violated the laws they themselves had passed and that their misconduct threatened to make her tourism campaign futile. She shocked the islanders by announcing her intention to resign the charter of the island back to the Crown "in somewhat the same way as the Hereditary le Mesurier Family did in Alderney" and to recommend that the government be taken over by Guernsey. The threat was effective; regulations were suddenly enforced much more strictly. By the beginning of the next year, Hathaway retracted her announcement, having been persuaded "by an enormous number of letters and requests".

== Death ==
Cyril Beaumont died in 1973, becoming the fifth child Dame Sibyl outlived. Early next year, the 90-year-old gave her approval for the stage presentation of William Douglas-Home's play The Dame of Sark, inspired by her experiences in the Second World War. She looked forward to meeting Celia Johnson, who was to play the title role, but died suddenly at the Seigneurie of a heart attack on 14 July 1974. The play was later adapted as a television film in 1976, with Johnson in the title role.

The seigneurship passed from the benevolent dictator, referred to as a "lady of unusual personality" by a British government official, to her grandson Michael Beaumont. Sark remained "the last bastion of feudalism", as she proudly put it, until 2008, when universal suffrage and a democratic leadership were established.

Preceded by William Frederick Collings	Dame of Sark; 1927–1974 with Robert Hathaway (1929–1954)	Succeeded by Michael Beaumont
