= La Seigneurie =

Home of the Seigneur of Sark

Coordinates: 49°26′16″N 2°21′46″W

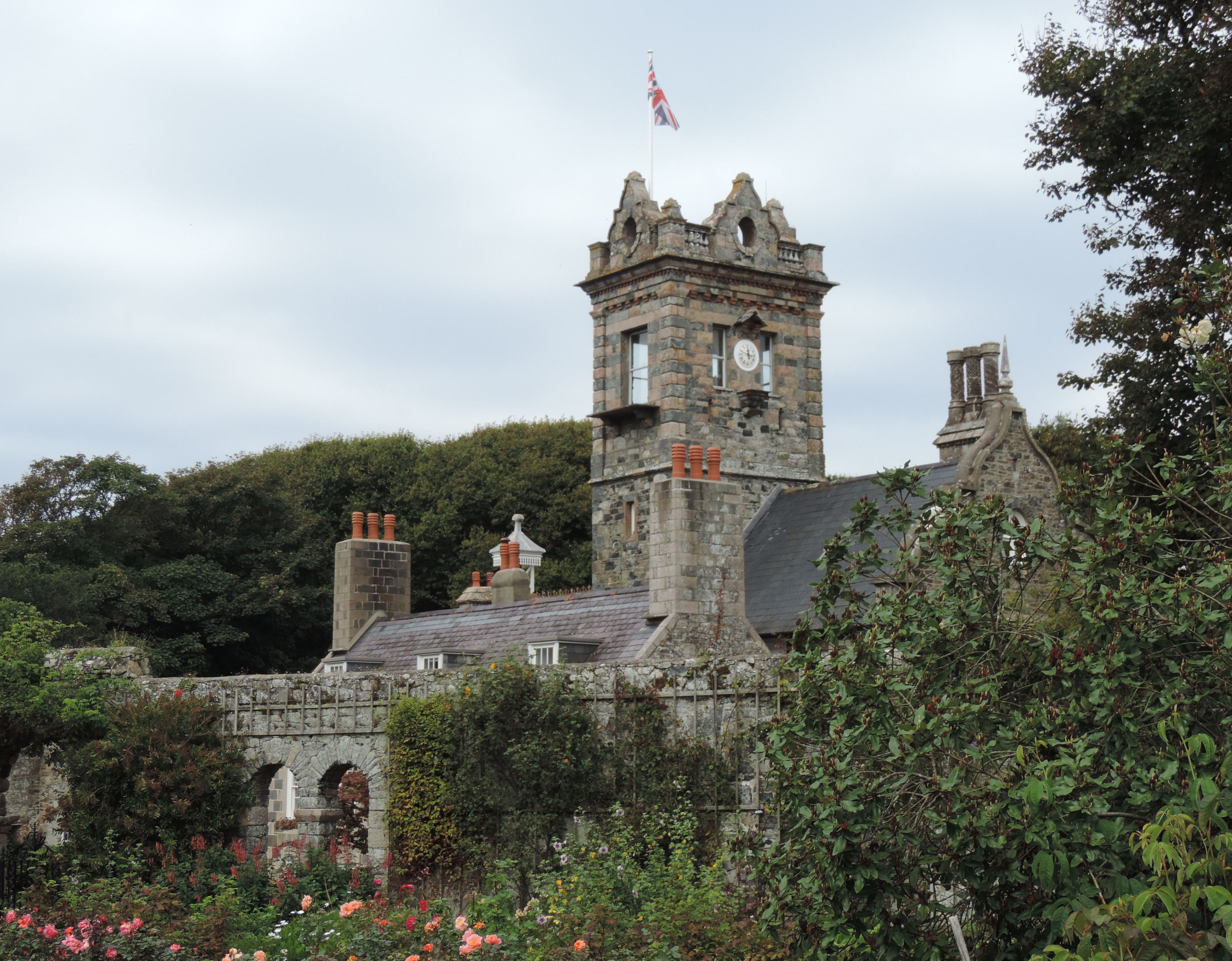
La Seigneurie (17th Century) in 2016

La Seigneurie is the traditional residence of the seigneur of Sark. The seigneur is the head of Sark in the Channel Islands.

Michael Beaumont, 22nd Seigneur of Sark, and his wife, Diana, moved from the Seigneurie to a smaller cottage on their estate when frail health triggered a need for a smaller residence that was better suited to aging residents. In 2009, Michael Beaumont agreed to allow David Synnott and his wife to live in the Seigneurie for ten years in return for making some renovations.

Michael Beaumont died on 3 July 2016 and was succeeded by his eldest son, Major Christopher Beaumont.

Both the house and the gardens of the Seigneurie are open to the public as of 2018.
