= Dennis O'Sullivan (Australian footballer) =

Australian rules footballer (1946–2018)

Personal information
- Full name: Dennis Francis O'Sullivan
- Born: 5 January 1946
- Died: 16 May 2018 (aged 72)
- Original team: Batman / Coburg YCW
- Height: 179 cm (5 ft 10 in)
- Weight: 77 kg (170 lb)

Playing career^{1}
Years	Club	Games (Goals)
1965	Carlton	3 (0)
- ^{1} Playing statistics correct to the end of 1965.

Dennis Francis O'Sullivan (5 January 1946 – 16 May 2018) was an Australian rules footballer who played with Carlton in the Victorian Football League (VFL).
