= Denis Sullivan (shipbuilder) =

Denis Sullivan was an Australian shipbuilder and key figure in the development of the town of Coopernook. He built ships at Coopernook, Cape Hawke, Berrys Bay and Clarence Town. He died in 1916 in Balmain, New South Wales.

== Ships built ==
Ship	Built	Tons	Notes
Bellengara			
Bellinger			
Bowra			
Coopernook			
Duroby			
Ellerslie	1906	252 tons	Ran aground and was wrecked on 22 May 1913
Gwendoline			
Hall Caine		214 tons	Capsized and sank in 1937
Hastings			
Maggie			
Otus	1914	80 tons	Ran aground and was wrecked on 17 January 1923
Perseverance	1874	133 tons	
Potts and Paul	1885	12 tons	Caught fire and sank in 1941
Premier			
Pyrmont			
Rock Lilly			
Seymour			
Storm King			
Tully			
Victor			
Wandra	1907	164 tons	Wrecked off Drum and Drumsticks, Jervis Bay, New South Wales on 15 November 1915
Wauchope	1887	196 tons	Caught fire on 1 August 1919 and sank near Portsea, Victoria
