= Denis O'Sullivan (Gaelic footballer) =

Irish Gaelic footballer and hurler

Personal information
- Native name: Donncha Ó Súilleabháin (Irish)
- Born: 11 June 1989 (age 37) Ballinascarty, County Cork, Ireland
- Occupation: Student
- Height: 6 ft 0 in (183 cm)

Sport
- Sport: Gaelic football
- Position: Right wing-back
Clubs
- Years: Club
- Ballinascarthy; Clonakilty; Cork
Club titles
- Cork titles: 0
Inter-county
Years	County	Apps (scores)
2011–2012 2014–	Cork; New York	7 (0–0); 1 (0–0)
Inter-county titles
- Munster titles: 1
- All-Irelands: 0
- NFL: 1
- All Stars: 0

Denis O'Sullivan (born 11 June 1989) is an Irish Gaelic footballer who plays as a left wing-back for the New York senior football team.

Born in Ballinascarty, County Cork, O'Sullivan arrived on the inter-county scene at the age of seventeen, when he first linked up with the Cork minor teams as a dual player, later joining the under-21 football side. He made his senior debut during the 2011 National Football League. Over the next few years, O'Sullivan became a regular member of the team and won one Munster medal and one National Football League medal. He currently plays with New York.

At club level, O'Sullivan began his career with Ballinascarthy before a controversial move to Clonakilty. He currently plays with Cork.

== Honours ==
=== Team ===
Cork

- Munster Senior Football Championship (1): 2012
- National Football League (1): 2011
