= Dennis Michael Sullivan =

American electrical engineer

Dennis Michael Sullivan is an electrical engineer from the University of Idaho, Moscow. He was named a Fellow of the Institute of Electrical and Electronics Engineers (IEEE) in 2013 for his contributions to time domain electromagnetic simulation.
