= Dennis Mark Sullivan =

American politician and businessman

Dennis Mark Sullivan (February 2, 1841 – November 13, 1917) was an American businessman and politician.

Sullivan was born in County Cork, Ireland and emigrated to the United States in 1850. He settled with his wife and family in Saint Paul, Ramsey County, Minnesota. Sullivan worked as a superintendent of the Minnesota Transfer Company. He served as the county auditor of Ramsey County and also served on the Saint Paul City Council. Sullivan served in the Minnesota House of Representatives in 1893 and 1894. He died in Saint Paul, Minnesota.
