= Sark Newspaper =

The Sark Newspaper is a controversial small publication, distributed free to residents of the island of Sark, and published online. It is edited by Kevin Delaney, who worked for the Barclay brothers, David Rowat Barclay and Frederick Hugh Barclay, publishing magnates.

According to BBC News the newspaper has "close ties to Sark Estate Management", owned by the Barclay brothers. Kevin Delaney had been a manager for Sark Estate Management until March 2015.

In January 2014 The Independent described the newspaper contributing to a poisonous climate. The BBC reported that tensions had risen to such a pitch that United Kingdom Ministry of Justice officials were monitoring the situation.

In November 2014 BBC News reported that police in nearby Guernsey had received complaints about the newspaper from about fifty Sark residents—ten percent of the Island's population. The BBC quoted Roseanne Byrnes, a member of the Chief Pleas, the island's legislature, who said the newspaper was "blighting my life and the lives of my family."

According to newspapers in Ireland, Denis Sullivan, formerly a member of Ireland's police service, the Garda Síochána, sued Delaney for defamation, in the Irish justice system.

The Middle East Eye characterized the newspaper as "almost exclusively filled with content that attacks the Sark parliament". However, in October and November 2014, the newspaper published criticisms of the government of Qatar at the same time newspapers officially run by the Barclay brothers were also attacking Qatar, on the same issues. The Middle East Eye pointed out that the Barclay brothers were in the midst of a financial dispute with Qatar.
