= Michael Beaumont, 22nd Seigneur of Sark =

22nd seigneur of Sark

Michael Beaumont OBE
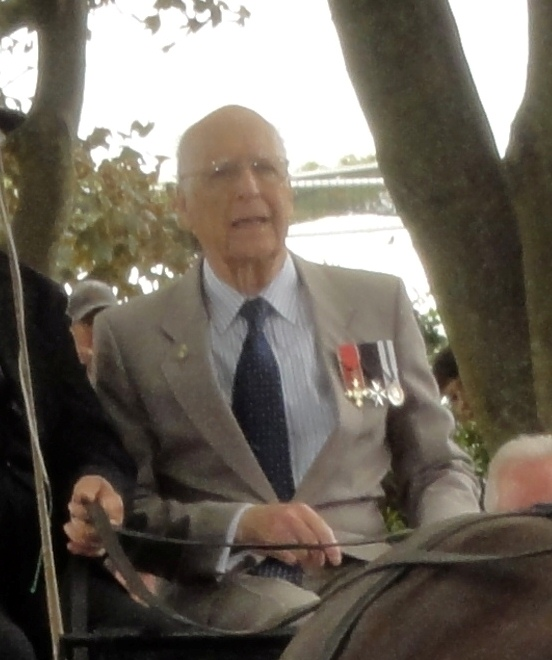
- Beaumont in July 2012

Seigneur of Sark
- In office 14 July 1974 – 3 July 2016
- Preceded by: Sibyl Hathaway
- Succeeded by: Christopher Beaumont

Personal details
- Born: John Michael Beaumont; 20 December 1927 Kingdom of Egypt
- Died: 3 July 2016 (aged 88) Sark, Bailiwick of Guernsey
- Spouse: Diana La Trobe-Bateman
- Children: Christopher Beaumont; Anthony Beaumont
- Parent(s): Francis William Beaumont; Enid Ripley

Seigneur John Michael Beaumont (20 December 1927 – 3 July 2016) was the 22nd Seigneur of Sark in the Channel Islands from 1974 until his death in 2016. He worked as a civil engineer before succeeding his paternal grandmother, Sibyl Hathaway, the 21st Dame of Sark, in 1974. During his rule, Beaumont saw the loss of many feudal rights enjoyed by the seigneurs, and he was consequently often described as the "last feudal baron".

== Family ==
Beaumont was the son of the Royal Air Force officer and film producer Francis William Beaumont and his first wife, Enid Ripley. His paternal grandmother, Sibyl Hathaway, ascended as the Dame of Sark six months before his birth.

Francis and Enid divorced in 1937 as a result of his adultery with an actress, Mary Lawson, whom he subsequently married. Beaumont's father and stepmother were killed on 4 May 1941, during the Liverpool Blitz, which left the 14-year-old Beaumont as heir to his grandmother.

Beaumont worked as a structural design engineer for the British Aircraft Corporation in Bristol before moving to Shoreham-by-Sea, where he worked on Beagle Aircraft. In 1956, Beaumont married Diana La Trobe-Bateman, and the couple had two sons, Christopher and Anthony.

== Seigneurship ==
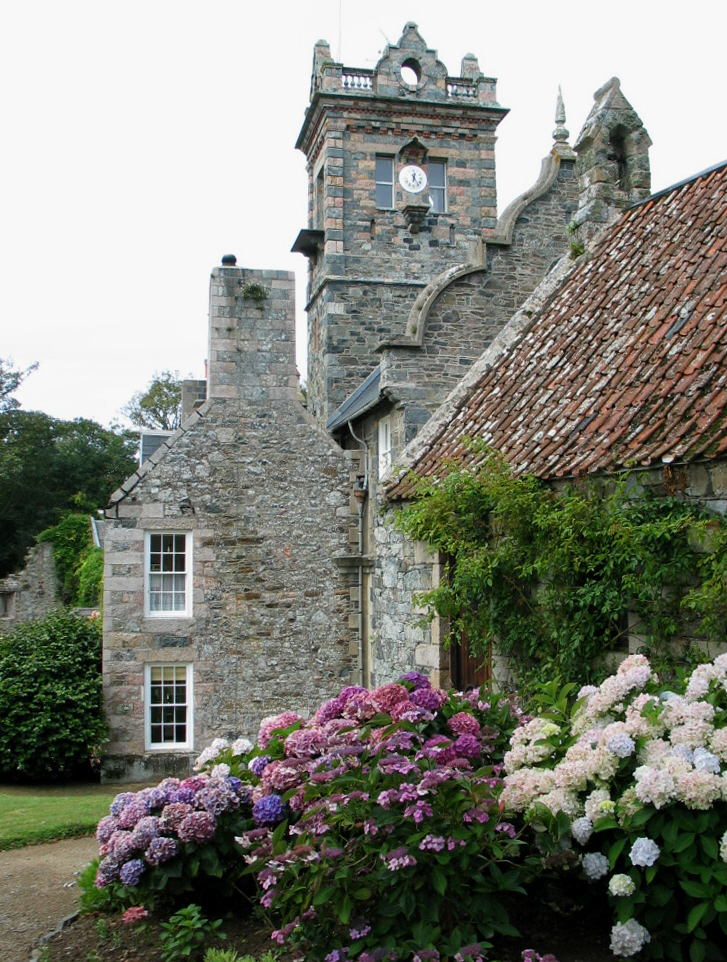
La Seigneurie in 2004

In 1974, Beaumont's grandmother died and he succeeded her as Seigneur of Sark. The new seigneur swore fealty to Queen Elizabeth in 1978, when she and the Duke of Edinburgh visited the island for the first time since his accession.

In 1990, a French nuclear physicist named André Gardes came to Sark to depose Beaumont and establish himself as seigneur, but this one-man "invasion" attempt failed.

During her 2001 visit, the Queen made the seigneur an Officer of the Order of the British Empire.

In 2008, Sark experienced a major change in the system of government. Beaumont remained the overlord of the island, but lost some of his feudal privileges. He did retain the privilege of being the only person on the island with the right to keep pigeons and an unspayed dog.

The first democratic elections on the island took place in December 2008. Beaumont appreciated the fact that it allowed his island to stay independent from Guernsey.

== Final years ==
Due to their poor health, the aging seigneur and his wife moved out of La Seigneurie, the traditional residence of the ruler of the island, to a more manageable cottage on their estate. In 2009, they agreed to allow David Synnott and his wife to live in the Seigneurie for ten years—until the end of October 2019. The rent is paid through renovations, and Synnott said that the seigneur was "effectively making a large and generous donation to his successor who will benefit from the work".

Beaumont's heir, his son, Major Christopher Beaumont, lived and worked with his family in Britain and served as an officer in the Royal Engineers. In 2008, he told the Chief Pleas that he intended to move back to Sark upon inheriting the fief.

In 2011, the seigneur declared that he would never consider selling his fief. Beaumont died on 3 July 2016 and was succeeded by his eldest son, Christopher.

Beaumont's widow, Diana, died on 1 December 2016. She was eighty years old when she died, which was less than five months after Beaumont's death.

Preceded by Sibyl Hathaway	Seigneur of Sark; 1974–2016	Succeeded by Christopher Beaumont
