= Christopher Beaumont, 23rd Seigneur of Sark =

Seigneur of Sark in the Channel Islands

- Seigneur

Seigneur of Sark
- Reign: 3 July 2016 - present
- Predecessor: Michael Beaumont
- Heir apparent: Hugh Rees-Beaumont
- Born: 4 February 1957 (age 69); Reigate, Surrey, England
- Father: Michael Beaumont
- Mother: Diana Beaumont

Christopher Beaumont (born 4 February 1957) is the current Seigneur of Sark in the Channel Islands since 2016. He is a former British Army officer.

== Biography ==
Beaumont is the son of Michael Beaumont, 22nd Seigneur of Sark and Diana Beaumont (née La Trobe-Bateman), he was born on 4 February 1957 in Reigate, Surrey.

Beaumont was educated at Broadwater Manor House School in Worthing, Clifton College and the Royal Military Academy Sandhurst, before taking up a career as a regular officer of the British Army. He succeeded as Seigneur of Sark on 3 July 2016, on the death of his father Michael Beaumont. He then returned to live on the island. He is known as ‘Fingers’ to the locals of Sark due to his piano playing.

== Military career ==
Christopher Beaumont was educated at the Royal Military Academy Sandhurst and served as a regular officer in the British Army. He was commissioned into the Royal Engineers in 1980, in his role he worked in military engineering and other support roles, and later reached the rank of Major before leaving active service in 1990.

After completing his military career in 1990, he succeeded his father as the 23rd Seigneur of Sark on 3 July 2016 and subsequently returned to live on the island to assume his hereditary responsibilities.

== Seigneurship ==
On 5 July 2016, the Sark Newspaper published an article which noted the new Seigneur's "impressive CV" and commented "Keen observers suggest that he is a man who will not be swayed by past convention. When on Sark he has often been seen to visit cafés and restaurants which are otherwise rigidly boycotted by members and supporters of Sark's one ruling party. For now, the people of Sark can only wait and hope that their new Seigneur will work to build a secure and prosperous future for each and every Islander." The newspaper hoped Beaumont would re-occupy La Seigneurie, the traditional residence of the Seigneur, and appealed for an economic plan to address local unemployment.

In an interview with the BBC on 15 July 2016, Beaumont defended Sark's feudal structure and the Island's legislature, the Chief Pleas, saying: "There's a perfectly good, working Chief Pleas, and it gets my full support." Constitutional reforms in 2008, which had the approval of his father the 22nd Seigneur, had devolved some of the feudal authority of the Seigneur to the legislature.

In 2009, after ill-health triggered Beaumont's parents to move out of the Seigneurie to a smaller cottage on the estate, they arranged for tenants to live in the Seigneurie for ten years, in return for making renovations.

Beaumont and his family moved into the Seigneurie in 2017 and have worked to restore its garden and grounds, which are now a visitor attraction.

== The future of Sark ==
Since 2023, Beaumont has been a director of the Sark Property Company, a company that has been set up to mobilise potential investment for Sark. Its intention is “to build a company that has the financial resources and the expertise to carry out multi-generational investments in Sark.”

Beaumont has said that Sark needs a long-term plan for its future and hopes his work with the Sark Property Company can help provide this.

In a letter to residents of Sark in April 2023, Beaumont said: “As part of the process the [Sark Property] company, in collaboration with key stakeholders, would like to see an independent, objective assessment of what the island needs and what aspirations the community has.”

That assessment was carried out by The Prince’s Foundation in the spring of 2023, with a full report made available to all.

Beaumont has advocated changes to Sark’s laws to prevent people claiming tax residency in Sark without needing to be present on the island for a set period of time, and believes that the provision of affordable housing is a key part of the island’s future.

Preceded by Michael Beaumont	Seigneur of Sark; 2016–present	Incumbent
