= Liverpool Blitz =

German bombing of British port city during WWII

- Part of the Strategic bombing campaign of World War II
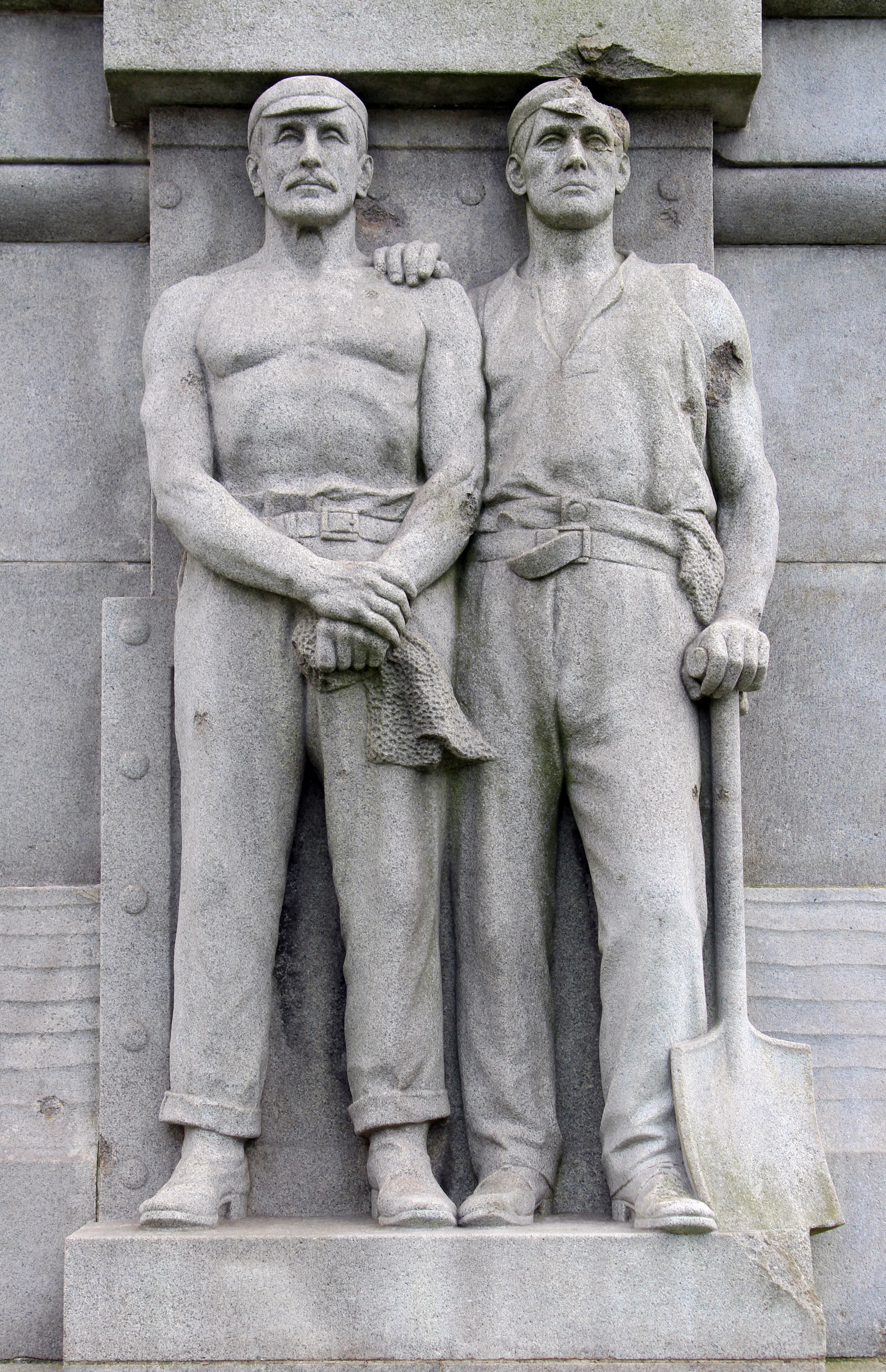
- Bomb damage visible on the Memorial to Heroes of the Marine Engine Room (photographed 2018)
Date	1940–1942
Location	Liverpool
Result	Liverpool heavily damaged by German air raids

Belligerents
Nazi Germany	United Kingdom

Casualties and losses
Unknown	4,000

The Liverpool Blitz was the heavy and sustained bombing of the British city of Liverpool and its surrounding area, during the Second World War by the German Luftwaffe.

Liverpool was the most heavily bombed area of the country outside London, due to Liverpool having, along with Birkenhead, the largest port on the west coast and being of significant importance to the British war effort. Descriptions of damage were kept vague to hide information from the Germans, and downplayed in the newspapers for propaganda purposes. Many Liverpudlians thus felt that their suffering was overlooked compared to other places. Around 4,000 people were killed in the Merseyside area during the Blitz. This death toll was second only to London, which suffered over 40,000 by the end of the war.

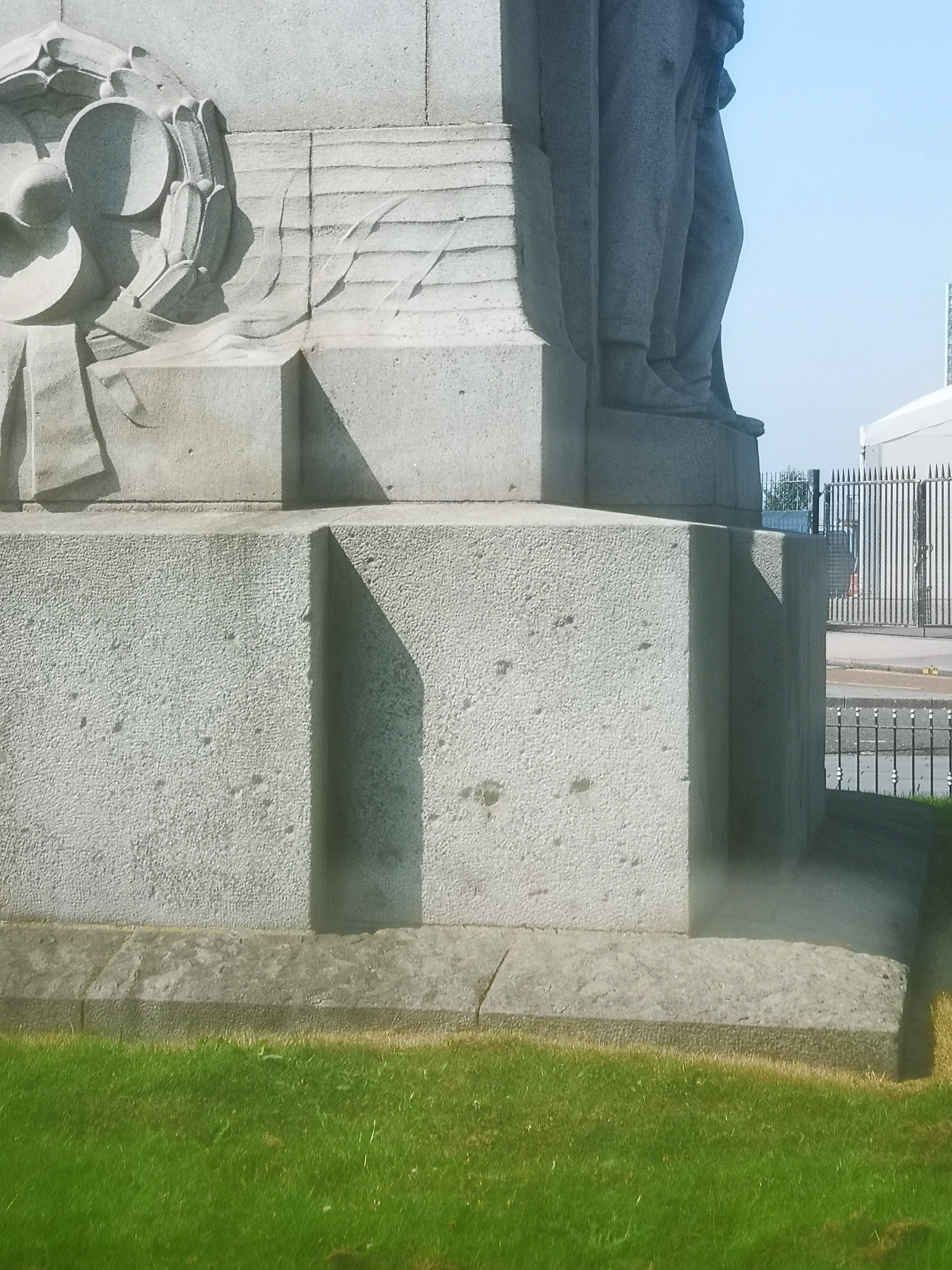
Bomb splinter damage on the lower section of the Titanic Memorial to Heroes of the Marine Engine Room, Liverpool, England

Liverpool, Bootle and the Wallasey Pool complex were strategically very important locations during the Second World War. The Port of Liverpool had for many years been the United Kingdom's main link with North America, and was a key supply hub in the Battle of the Atlantic. As well as providing anchorage for naval ships from many nations, the port's quays and dockers handled over 90 per cent of all the war material brought into Britain from abroad, with some 75 million tons passing through its 11 miles (18 km) of quays. Liverpool was the eastern end of a Transatlantic chain of supplies from North America. Other industries were also heavily concentrated in Liverpool and across the Mersey in Birkenhead.

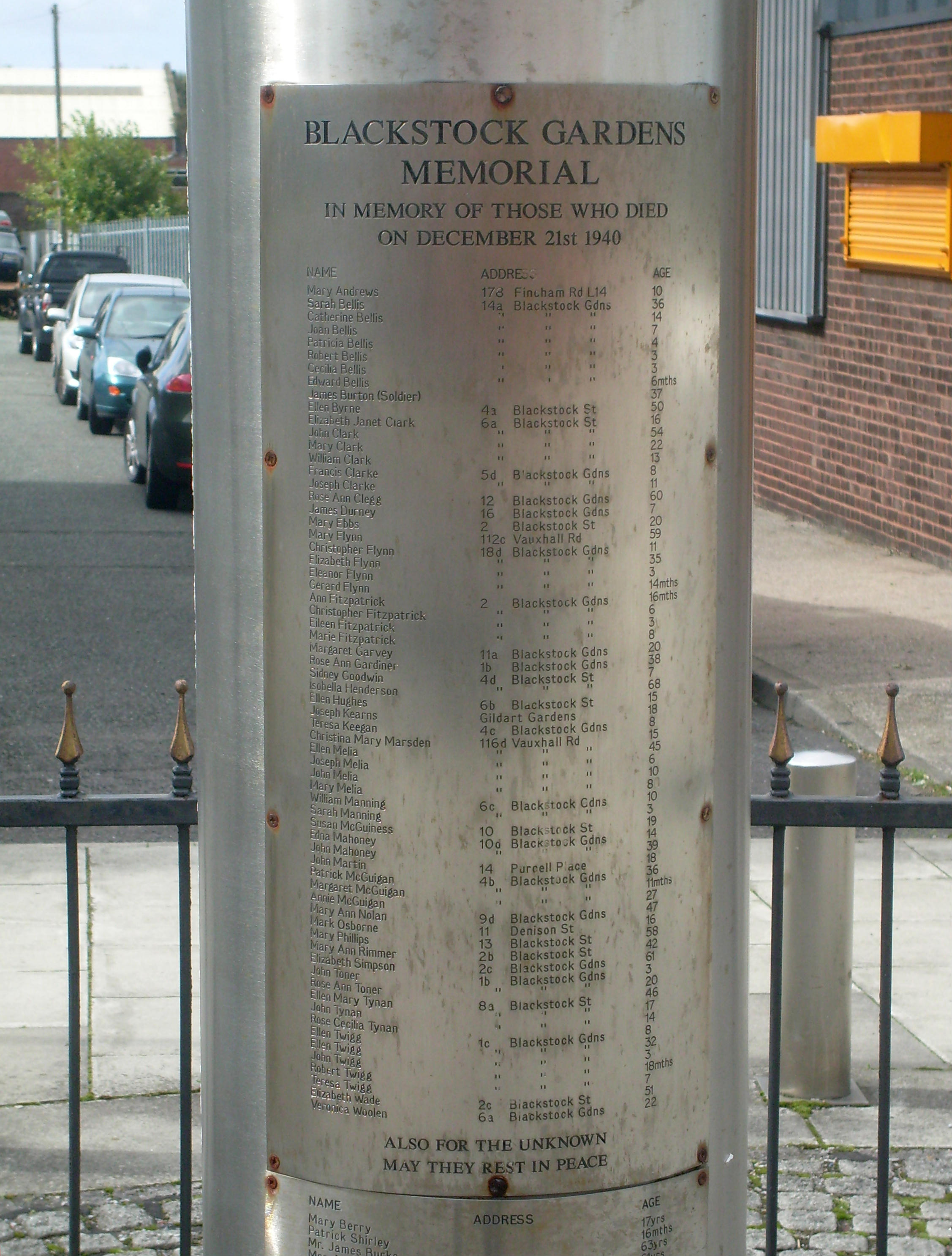
A plaque on a memorial to those killed on 21 December at Blackstock Gardens, Liverpool

== Preparations for war ==
The evacuation of children, Operation Pied Piper, at the start of the war, in September 1939, was a pre-emptive measure to save the population of urban or military areas from German aerial bombing. Between 1–6 September the evacuations, organised by Liverpool Corporation, saw 8,500 children, parents and teachers moved from the city to rural areas and small towns in Lancashire, Wales, Cheshire, Shrewsbury and Shropshire.

As months went by with no signs of an air-raid by the Luftwaffe, many parents brought their children back to Liverpool and, by January 1940, 40% of the evacuated children were back in the city.

== Beginning of the Blitz ==
The first major air raid on Liverpool took place in August 1940, when 160 bombers attacked the city on the night of 28 August.

This assault continued over the next three nights, then regularly for the rest of the year. There were 50 raids on the city during this three-month period. Some of these were minor, comprising a few aircraft, and lasting a few minutes, with others comprising up to 300 aircraft and lasting over ten hours. On 18 September, 22 inmates at Walton Gaol were killed when high-explosive bombs demolished a wing of the prison.

28 November saw a heavy raid on the city, and the most serious single incident, when a hit on an air-raid shelter in Durning Road caused 166 fatalities. Winston Churchill described it as the "single worst incident of the war".

The air assault in 1940 came to a peak with the Christmas Blitz, a three-night bombardment from 20–22 December.

== Christmas Blitz ==
A series of heavy raids took place in December 1940, referred to as the Christmas Blitz, when 365 people were killed between 20–22 December. The raids saw several instances of direct hits on air raid shelters; on 20 December, 42 people died when a shelter was hit, while another 40 died when a bomb struck railway arches on Bentinck Street, where local people were sheltering. On 21 December, another hit on a shelter which killed 74 people.

In her memoir Lime Street at Two, Helen Forrester described trying to get home from her job at Bootle during the Christmas Blitz:

In the light of flares, fires, tracer bullets and searchlights, it was easy to see. I felt cross; I was not going to be kept from home by any German planes. I began to walk...At several points, the raid passed right overhead at a time when there seemed no place to hide...A series of bombs appeared to hit the next street, and I was suddenly glad that I had been faced with a blank wall on my side of the street, and was consequently, sprawled in the gutter; if there had been a house or shop doorway in which to shelter, I could well have been speared by glass slivers bursting from the windows. On the theory that a moving object was harder to hit than a stationary one, I ran like a frightened alley cat, in the hope of avoiding an incendiary bomb or heavy piece of debris falling on me. Incendiary bombs, though quite small, were deadly if they fell on someone, and flak from our anti-aircraft guns or flying pieces of rubble and glass from bombed buildings, were more of a menace than the chance of being caught directly by an exploding bomb. Another great danger was from falling power lines, still live and spitting like angry dragons...'I'll cross William Brown Street, where the Picton Library is, and skirt around the wall of St John's Garden. It'll give me a bit of protection,' I told myself. By doing this I avoided the wide open spaces of this handsome part of Liverpool and would be less likely to be hit. I would also bypass most of Lime Street, still the main walk for prostitutes in the city, where I had no doubt it would be business as usual, blitz or no blitz; it was not the ladies I feared, but their pimps and hangers-on. The city was in turmoil, with service vehicles zipping recklessly through the battered streets. There seemed to be a very big fire at the beginning of Dale Street, and behind the buildings past which I ran up to the far end of Lime Street, there was obviously another heavy conflagration, which I afterwards was told was St John's market burning...As I ran, incendiaries fell like rain, and magnificent St George's Hall was alight; I was told later that there were hundreds of people sheltering in the cells underneath it, unaware that the building above them was in flames. Though I was aware only of a blizzard of bombs, flak and hazardous litter on the pavements, a short distance away a bomb fell in front of the Court Theatre, and a fire engine, racing to a call, fell into the crater, killing the entire crew of seven; so much for speed in such a situation. I was lucky that I did not fall over something or into something myself. I felt naked as I left Renshaw Street behind me, and climbed the hill towards Catherine Street. To my right, the Anglican Cathedral was outlined against a rosy sky. It seemed less noisy here, and was totally deserted. The quiet rage, which had sustained me through the city, began to drain, and I was aware of intolerable fatigue. There were several hospitals at the top of the hill, where cars and ambulances were coming and going steadily. I wondered if I should give up, and take refuge in one of them. But I was very close to home, and hospitals could be hit, too. In fact, during that night the Royal Infirmary and the Mill Road Infirmary were severely damaged. I dragged onwards slowly, bothered by the smoke and dust in the atmosphere as well as by the sound of bombs whistling down on the city centre. At the sound of the front door being opened and closed, Father, his face filled with anxiety, came up from the cellar steps. 'God! Whatever happened to you?' he exclaimed. I licked my parched lips. 'I walked,' I said simply.

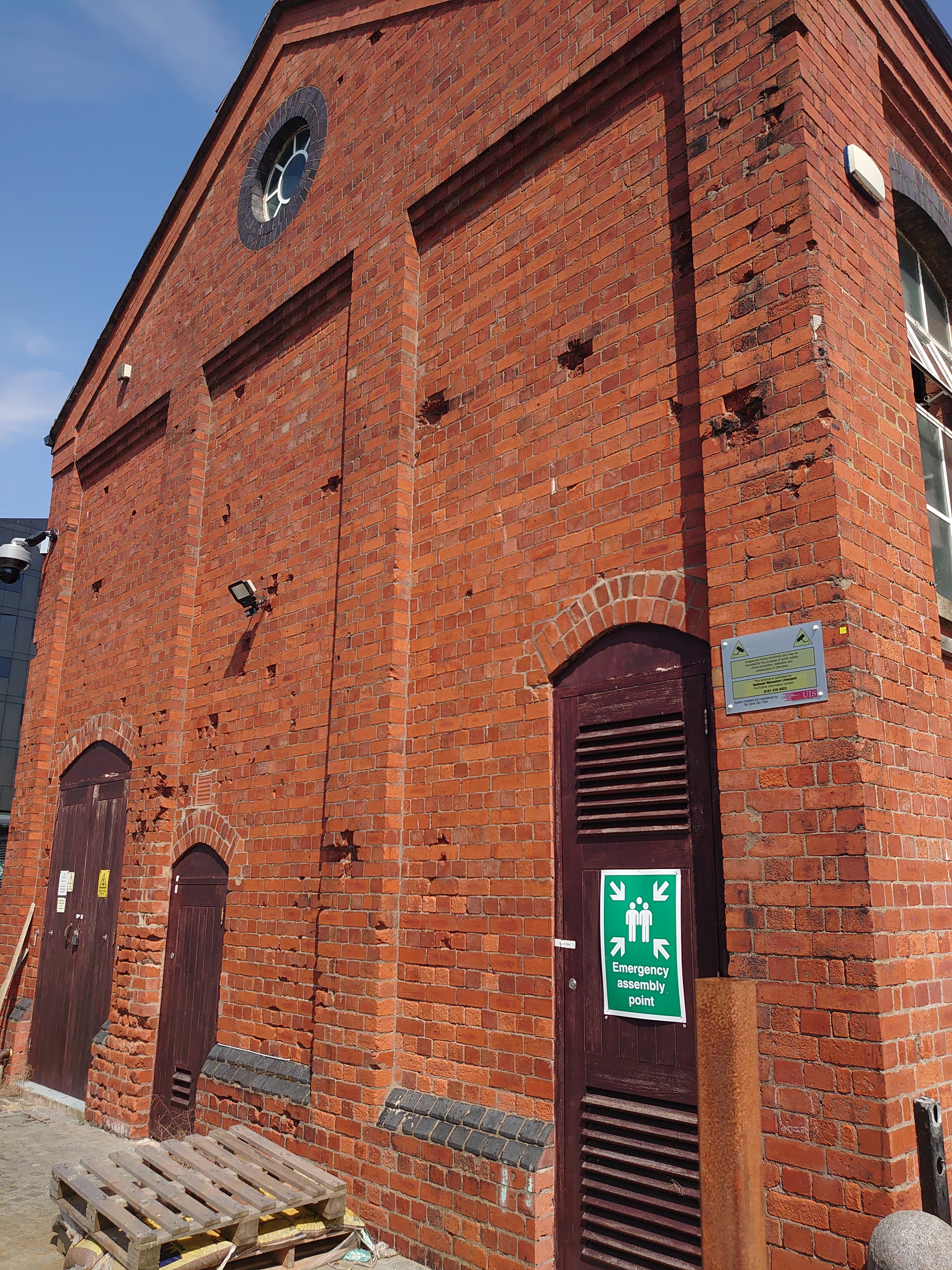
WW2 splinter damage on a western wall of the Great Western Railway Warehouse, Liverpool, England

The bombing decreased in severity after the new year.

== May Blitz ==
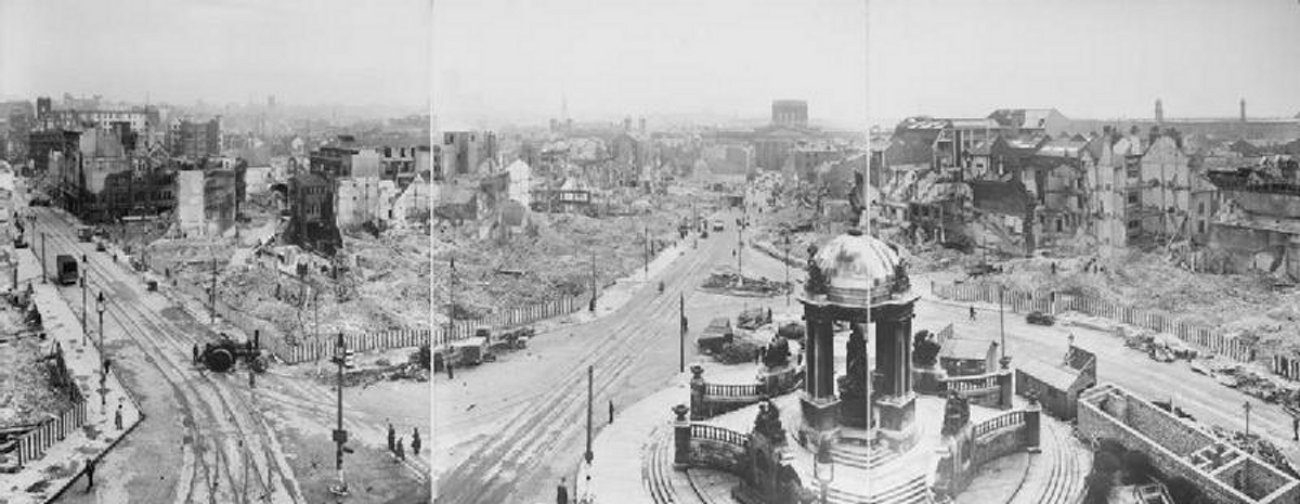
A panoramic view of bomb damage in Liverpool. The Victoria Monument is in the foreground. The burned-out shell of the Custom House is in the middle distance

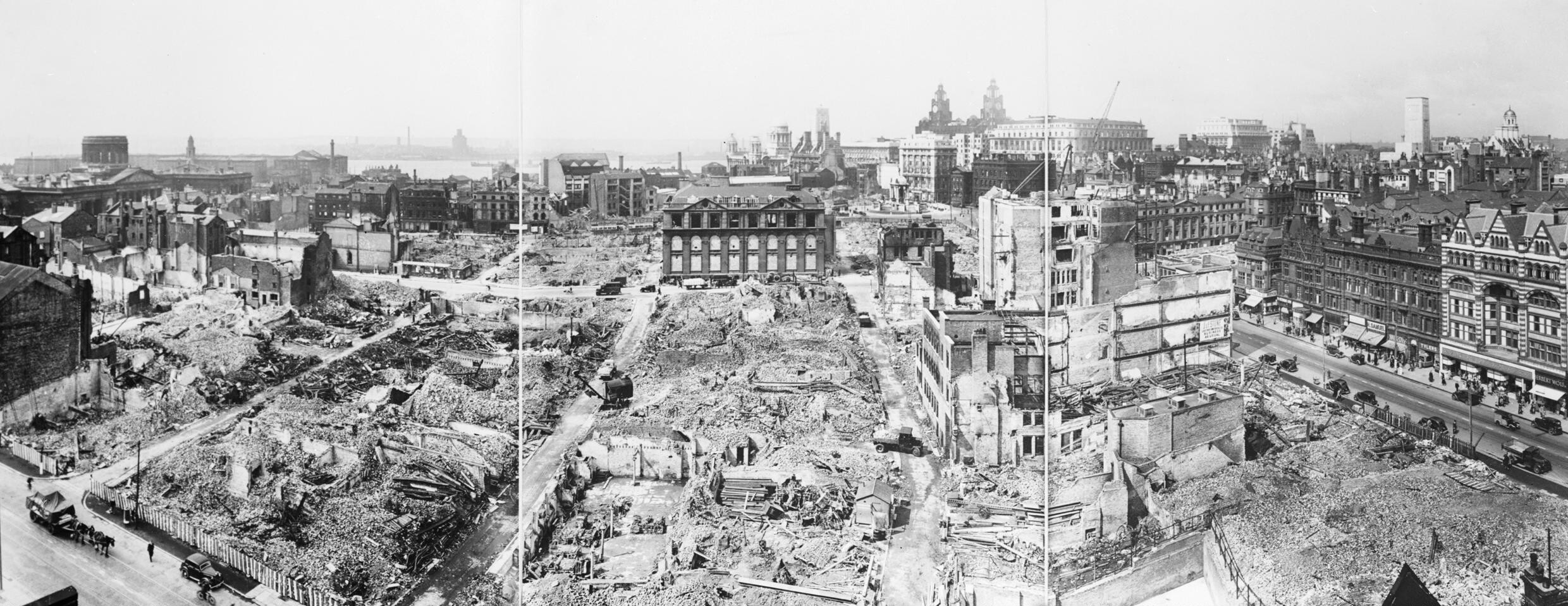
A panoramic view, looking towards the River Mersey. The Custom House is at left. The Liver Building is in the middle distance

May 1941 saw a renewal of the air assault on the region; a seven-night bombardment that devastated the city. The first bomb landed upon Seacombe, Wallasey, Wirral, at 22:15 on 1 May. The peak of the bombing occurred from 1–7 May 1941. It involved 681 Luftwaffe bombers; 2,315 high explosive bombs and 119 other explosives such as incendiaries were dropped. The raids put 69 out of 144 cargo berths out of action and inflicted 2,895 casualties. (Note: 1,741 people were killed and 1,154 people were injured)

Liverpool Cathedral was hit by a high explosive bomb which pierced the roof of the south-east transept before being deflected by an inner brick wall and exploding mid-air, damaging many stained glass windows. Another landed on the front steps without exploding but incendiaries destroyed equipment in the contractor's yard at the west end.

One incident on 3 May involved the SS Malakand, a ship carrying munitions which was berthed in the Huskisson Dock. Although its eventual explosion is often attributed to a burning barrage balloon, this fire was put out. Flames from dock sheds that had been bombed spread to the Malakand, and this fire could not be contained. Despite valiant efforts by the fire brigade to extinguish the flames, they spread to the ship's cargo of 1,000 tons of bombs, which exploded a few hours after the raid had ended. The entire Huskisson No. 2 dock and the surrounding quays were destroyed and four people were killed. The explosion was so violent that some pieces of the ship's hull plating were blasted into a park over 1 mile (1.6 km) away. It took seventy-four hours for the fire to burn out.

The seven night bombardment resulted in over 6,500 homes being completely demolished by aerial bombing and a further 190,000 damaged, leaving 70,000 people homeless. 500 roads were closed to traffic as well as railways and tram lines being destroyed. 700 water mains and 80 sewers were damaged alongside gas, electricity and telephone services. 9,000 workers from outside the city and 2,700 troops helped to remove debris from streets. On the night of the 3rd and 4th of May alone, 400 fires were attended to by the fire brigade.

Bootle, to the north of the city, suffered heavy damage and loss of life. A notable incident was a direct hit on a Co-op air raid shelter on the corner of Ash Street and Stanley Road. The exact total of casualties is unclear, though dozens of bodies were recovered and placed in a temporary mortuary, which was later destroyed by incendiaries with over 180 corpses inside.

The Times on 5 May 1941 carried the following report: "The Germans stated that Saturday night's attack on Liverpool was one of the heaviest ever made by their air force on Britain. Several hundred bombers had been used, visibility was good and docks and industrial works, storehouses and business centres, had been hit. In addition to many smaller fires, one conflagration, it was claimed, was greater than any hitherto observed during a night attack."

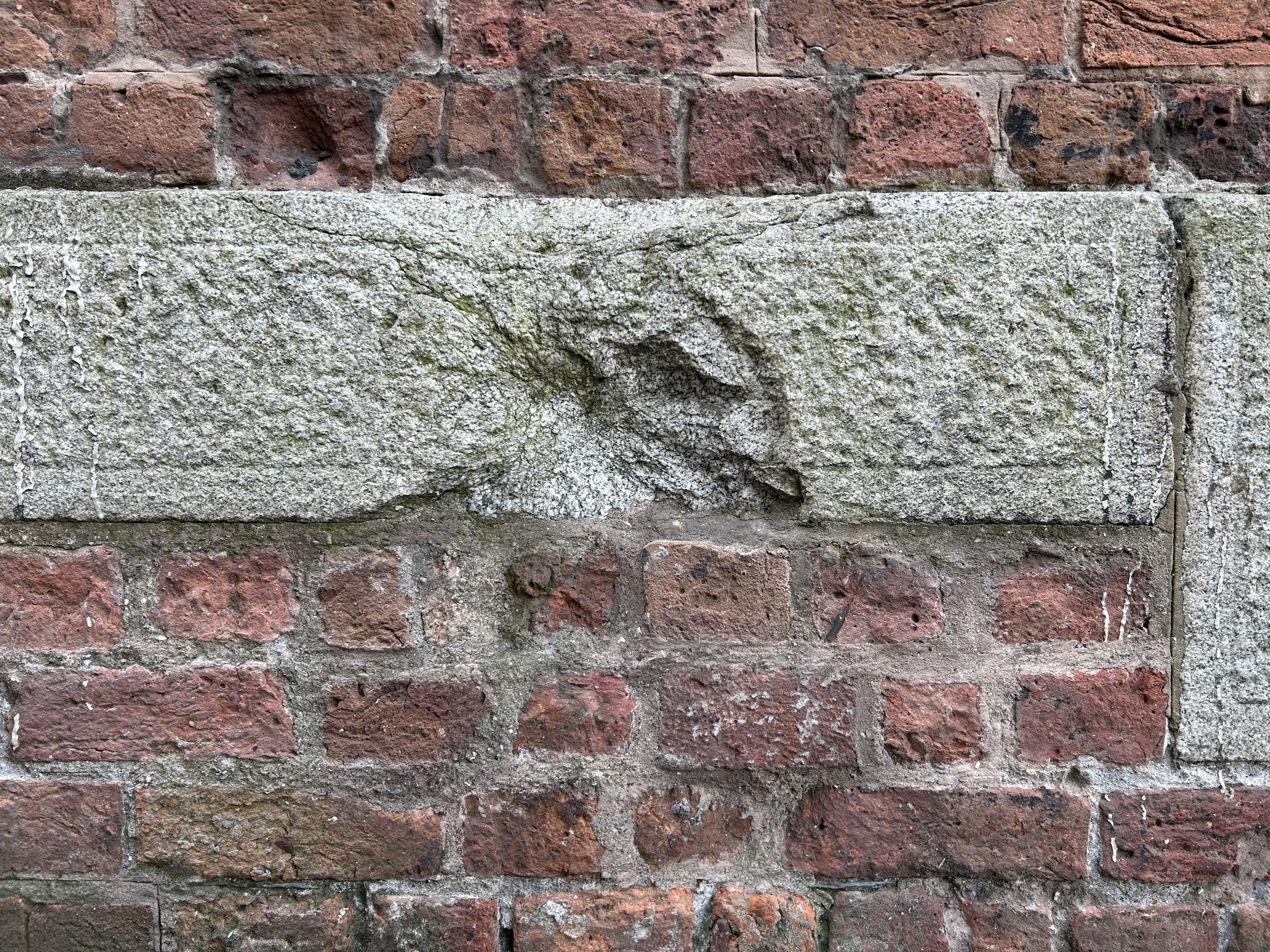
Bomb splinter damage on a north east wall of the Maritime Museum, Liverpool, England

== End of the Blitz ==
After the raids in May 1941, the German air assault diminished, as Hitler's attention turned towards attacking the Soviet Union. The last German air raid on Liverpool took place on 10 January 1942, destroying several houses on Upper Stanhope Street. By a quirk of fate one of the houses destroyed was number 102, which had been the home of Alois Hitler, Jr, half brother of Adolf Hitler and the birthplace of Hitler's nephew, William Patrick Hitler. The house was never rebuilt and the whole site was eventually cleared of housing and grassed over.

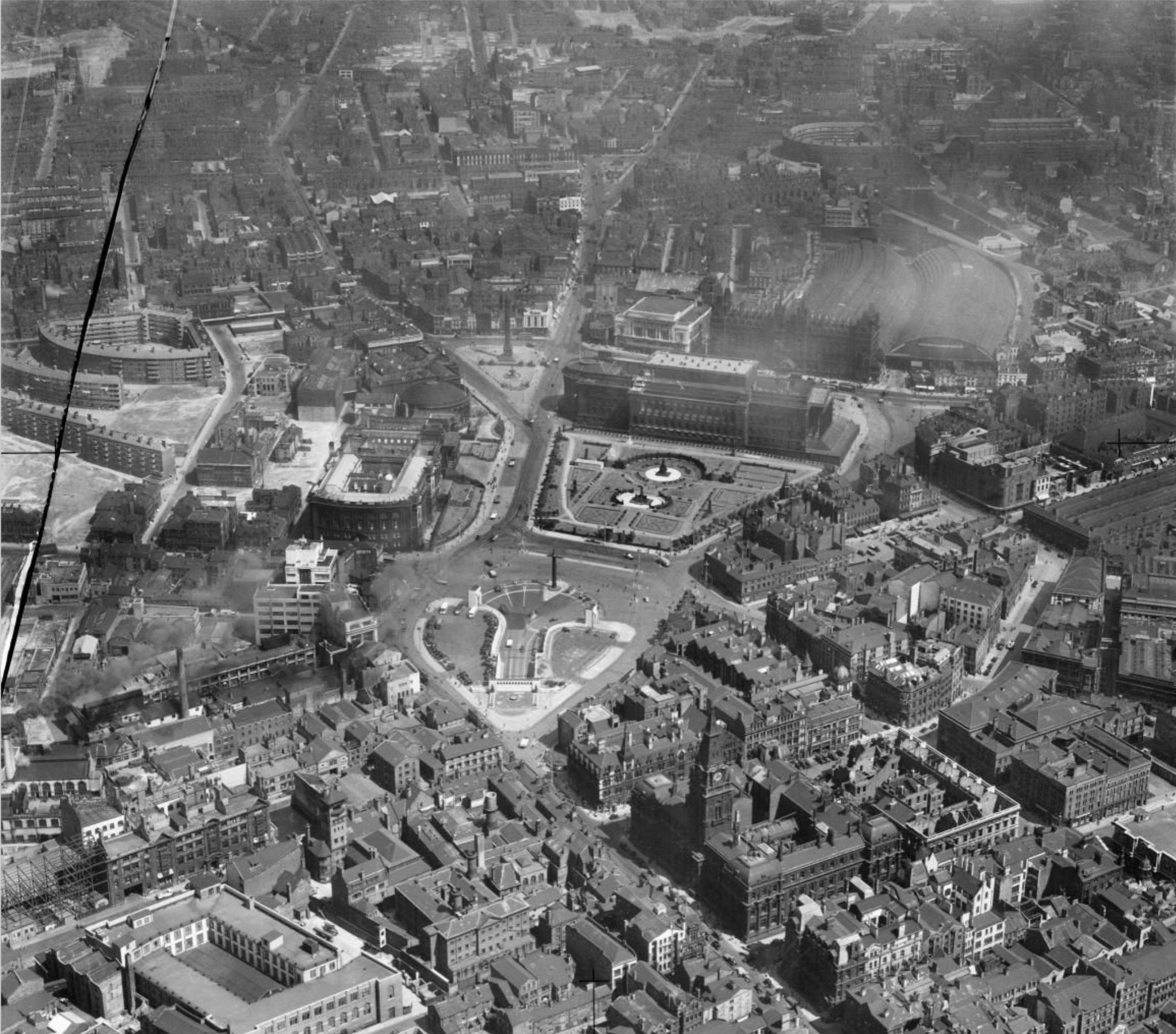
Liverpool's Lime Street area in 1946

By the end German bombs had killed 2,716 people in Liverpool, 442 people in Birkenhead, 409 people in Bootle and 332 people in Wallasey.

== Aftermath ==
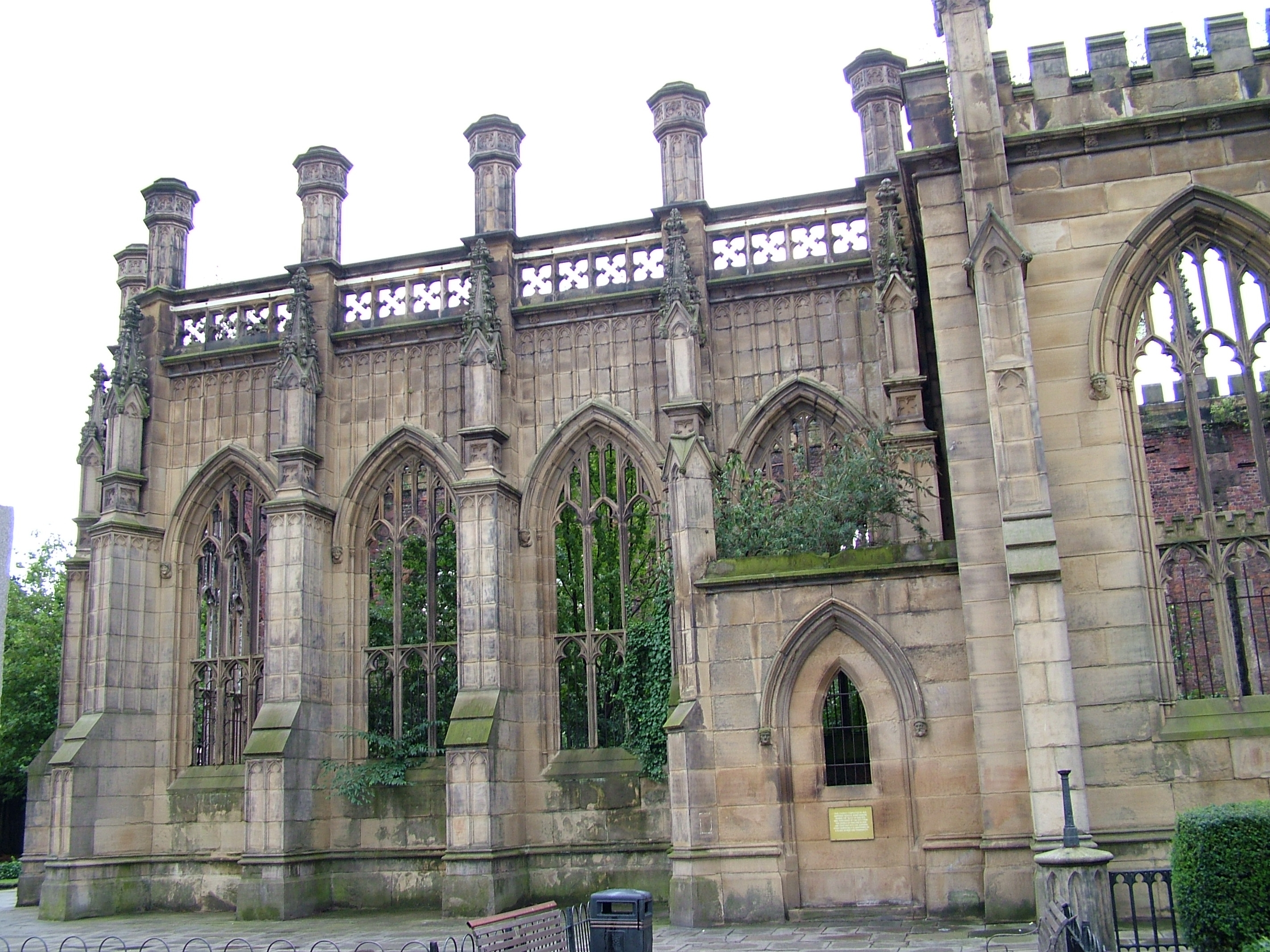
Trees now grow in the shell of St Luke's Church

Today one of the most vivid symbols of the Liverpool Blitz is the burnt outer shell of St Luke's Church, located in the city centre, which was destroyed by an incendiary bomb on 5 May 1941. The church was gutted during the firebombing but remained standing and, in its prominent position in the city, was a stark reminder of what Liverpool and the surrounding area had endured. It eventually became a garden of remembrance to commemorate the thousands of local men, women and children who died as a result of the bombing of their city and region.

Other architectural casualties of the Blitz included the Custom House, Bluecoat Chambers, and Liverpool Museum. However, many buildings were restored after the War, while the Custom House was controversially demolished.

British Prime Minister Winston Churchill in May 1941 said after visiting Liverpool and the surrounding area, "I see the damage done by the enemy attacks, but I also see ... the spirit of an unconquered people."

== Notable victims ==
- Mary Lawson, film and stage actress
- Francis William Beaumont, her husband; heir to the Seigneur of Sark and an RAF officer

== See also ==
- History of Liverpool
- The Blitz
