= Pelly =

Pelly may refer to:

== Places ==
=== Canada ===
- Pelly, Saskatchewan
  - Fort Pelly, a former Hudson's Bay Company fur trading post
  - Pelly (Saskatchewan electoral district)
- Pelly Island, in the Beaufort Sea
- Pelly Peak, a mountain in British Columbia
- Pelly River, in Yukon

=== United States ===
- Pelly, Texas, now merged into Baytown

== People ==
- Pelly (surname)
- Pelly Ruddock Mpanzu (born 1993), English footballer
- Pelly baronets, a title in the Baronetage of the United Kingdom

== See also ==
- Kpelle (disambiguation)
- Pel (disambiguation)
- Pell (disambiguation)
- Pelley, a surname
- Pelli, a surname
- Pellyton, Kentucky, U.S.
