= Pelly (surname) =

Pelly is a surname. Notable people with the surname include:

- Blake Pelly (1907–1990), Australian air force officer, politician and businessman
- Sir Claude Pelly (1902–1972), British air chief marshal
- Fred Pelly (1868–1940), English footballer
- Henry Joseph Pelly (1818–1891), British Army officer and a general in the Indian Army's Bombay Staff Corps
- John Pelly, (1777–1852), English businessman and Hudson's Bay Company governor, first Baronet Pelly
- Laurent Pelly (born 1962), French opera and theatre director
- Lewis Pelly (1825–1892), British politician and East India Company lieutenant general
- Pat Pelly (1877–1939), Australian rules footballer
- Thomas Pelly (1902–1973), American politician
- Tom Pelly (1936–2006), Australian rules footballer
- various Pelly baronets

== See also ==
- Pelley, surname
- Pelli, surname
