= Alan Brooke (disambiguation) =

Alan Brooke, 1st Viscount Alanbrooke (1883–1963) was a senior officer of the British Army.

Alan Brooke may also refer to:

- Alan Brooke, 3rd Viscount Brookeborough (born 1952), Northern Irish peer and landowner
- Victor Brooke, 3rd Viscount Alanbrooke (Alan Victor Harold Brooke, 1932–2018), British peer
- Alan Brooke (priest) (1863–1939), English academic
