= Pelly Bay (disambiguation) =

Pelly Bay is an Arctic waterway in Kitikmeot Region, Nunavut, Canada.

Pelly Bay may also refer to:

- Kugaaruk, a hamlet in Nunavut, Canada, formerly known as Pelly Bay, Northwest Territories
  - Kugaaruk Airport, formerly Pelly Bay Townsite Airport
- Pelly Bay SRR Site, a North Warning System and former NORAD DEW Line radar station, and former airstrip

== See also ==
- Pelly (disambiguation)
- Bay (disambiguation)
