= Pelly Mountain =

Pelly Mountain may refer to:

- Pelly Peak, in British Columbia, Canada
- Uvayuq, formerly Mount Pelly, in Nunavut, Canada
- Pelly Mountains, in Yukon, Canada

== See also ==
- Pelly (disambiguation)
