= Henry Pelly =

Henry Pelly may refer to:

- Sir Henry Pelly, 3rd Baronet (1844–1877), British politician
- Henry Joseph Pelly (1818–1891), British Army officer and general in the Indian Army
