= Viscount Alanbrooke =

Extinct viscountcy in the Peerage of the United Kingdom

Viscountcy of Alanbrooke
- Arms: Or, a Cross engrailed per pale Gules and Sable, in the first quarter a Crescent Gules. Crest: A Brock statant proper. Supporters: On either side an Officer of the Royal Horse Guards in full dress proper, supporting with the exterior hand an Escutcheon Azure, charged with seven Barrulets wavy Argent, surmounted by a Salmon rising Gules.
- Creation date: 29 January 1946
- Created by: King George VI
- Peerage: Peerage of the United Kingdom
- First holder: Alan Brooke, 1st Baron Alanbrooke
- Last holder: Victor Brooke, 3rd Viscount Alanbrooke
- Remainder to: The 1st Viscount’s heirs male of the body lawfully begotten
- Subsidiary titles: Baron Alanbrooke
- Status: Extinct
- Extinction date: 10 January 2018
- Motto: GLORIA FINIS (Glory to the end)

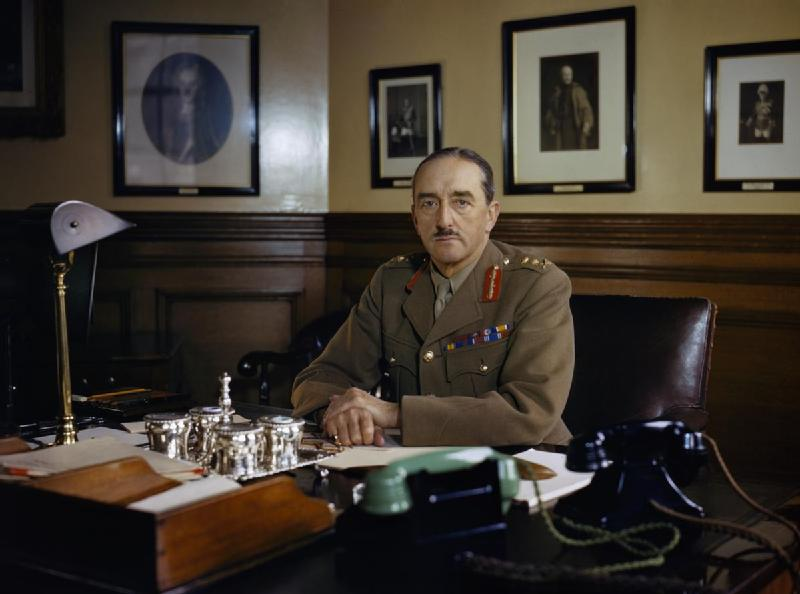
The 1st Viscount Alanbrooke.

Viscount Alanbrooke, of Brookeborough in the County of Fermanagh, was a title in the Peerage of the United Kingdom.

It was created on 29 January 1946 for Field Marshal Alan Brooke, 1st Baron Alanbrooke. He had already been created Baron Alanbrooke, of Brookeborough in the County of Fermanagh, on 18 September 1945, also in the Peerage of the United Kingdom. Brooke was the sixth son of Sir Victor Brooke, 3rd Baronet, and the uncle of Sir Basil Brooke, 5th Bt. (created Viscount Brookeborough in 1952), the Prime Minister of Northern Ireland from May 1943 until March 1963.

Field Marshal Lord Alanbrooke was succeeded by his elder son, Thomas, who was unmarried and had no children. The titles were then held by his half-brother, Alan Brooke's younger son, also named Alan (but popularly known as Victor). The 3rd Viscount died on 10 January 2018 and the viscountcy became extinct on his death.

== Viscounts Alanbrooke (1946) ==
- Alan Francis Brooke, 1st Viscount Alanbrooke (1883–1963)
- Thomas Brooke, 2nd Viscount Alanbrooke (1920–1972)
- Alan Victor Harold Brooke, 3rd Viscount Alanbrooke (1932–2018)

== See also ==
- Viscount Brookeborough
