= Pelley =

Pelley is a surname, and may refer to:

- Graydon Pelley, Canadian politician
- J-Min Pelley (born 1998), Canadian football player
- John J. Pelley (1878–1946), American railroad executive
- Keith Pelley (born 1964), Canadian sports executive
- Rod Pelley (born 1984), Canadian ice hockey player
- Scott Pelley (born 1957), American television journalist
- William Dudley Pelley (1890–1965), United States activist and Nazi sympathizer

== See also ==
- le Pelley
- Pelly (surname)
- Pelli, surname
