= Alan Brooke, 1st Viscount Alanbrooke =

British Army field marshal (1883–1963)

Field Marshal The Right Honourable The Viscount Alanbrooke KG GCB OM GCVO DSO & Bar
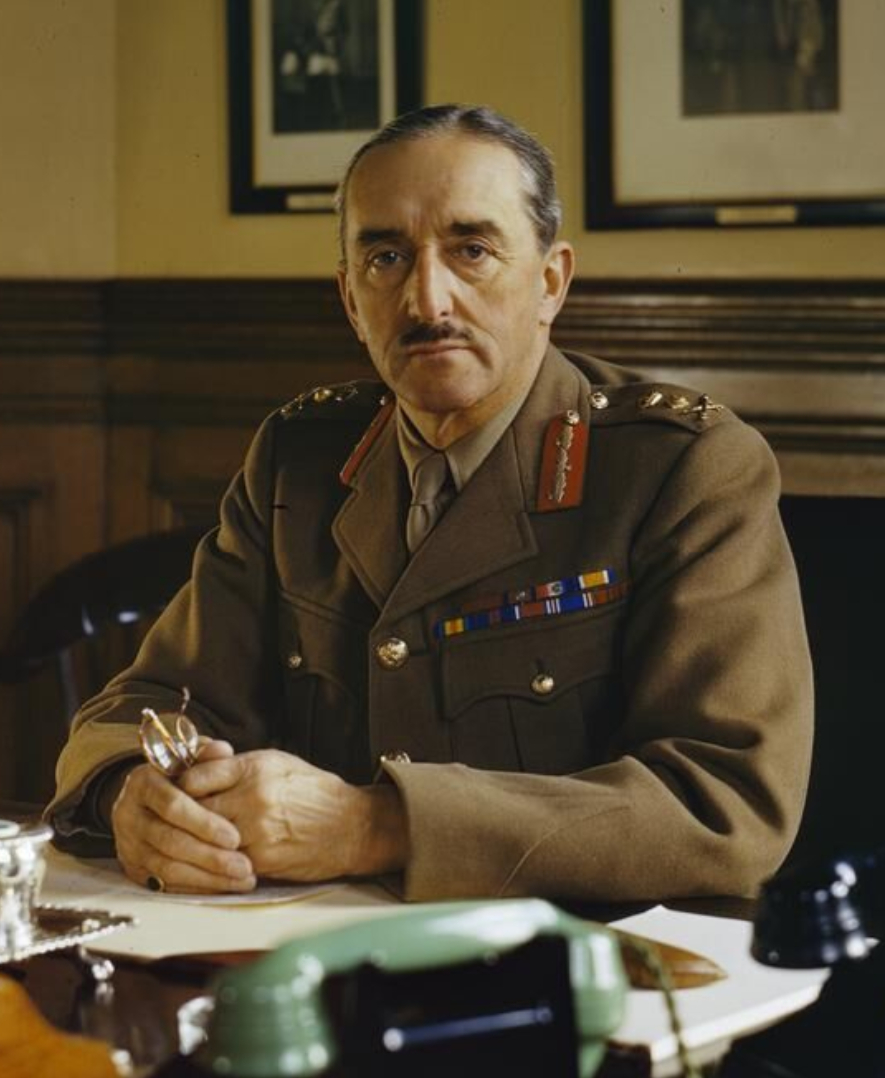
- Brooke in 1942
- Born: 23 July 1883; Bagnères-de-Bigorre, France
- Died: 17 June 1963 (aged 79); Hartley Wintney, Hampshire, England
- Burial place: St Mary's Church, Hartley Wintney
- Education: Royal Military Academy, Woolwich; Staff College, Camberley; Imperial Defence College
- Spouse(s): Jane Richardson (m. 1914; died 1925) Benita Lees (m. 1928)
- Children: 4, including Thomas and Victor
- Relatives: Victor Brooke (father); Basil Brooke (nephew)
- Military career
- Allegiance: United Kingdom
- Branch: British Army
- Service years: 1902–1946
- Rank: Field Marshal
- Nicknames: "Brookie" "Colonel Shrapnel"
- Unit: Royal Artillery
- Commands: Chief of the Imperial General Staff (1941–1946); Home Forces (1940–1941); II Corps (1939–1940); Southern Command (1939); Mobile Division (1937); 8th Infantry Brigade (1934–1935); Royal School of Artillery (1929–1932)
- Conflicts: First World War: Second World War
- Awards: Knight Companion of the Order of the Garter; Knight Grand Cross of the Order of the Bath; Member of the Order of Merit; Knight Grand Cross of the Royal Victorian Order; Companion of the Distinguished Service Order & Bar; Mentioned in despatches (7); See below

3rd Chancellor of the Queen's University Belfast
- In office 1949–1963
- Preceded by: The 7th Marquess of Londonderry
- Succeeded by: Sir Tyrone Guthrie

Member of the House of Lords
- Lord Temporal
- In office 29 January 1946 – 17 June 1963; Hereditary peerage
- Preceded by: Peerage created
- Succeeded by: The 2nd Viscount Alanbrooke

Lord Lieutenant of the County of London
- In office 23 August 1950 – 25 April 1957
- Monarchs: George VI; Elizabeth II
- Preceded by: The 1st Earl Wavell
- Succeeded by: The 1st Earl Alexander of Tunis

Field Marshal Alan Francis Brooke, 1st Viscount Alanbrooke (23 July 1883 – 17 June 1963), was a senior officer of the British Army. He was Chief of the Imperial General Staff (CIGS), the professional head of the British Army, during the Second World War, and was promoted to field marshal on 1 January 1944.

Brooke trained as an artillery officer and became Commandant of the School of Artillery, Larkhill in 1929. He held various divisional and corps level commands before the Second World War and became C-in-C Home Forces in 1940.

Brooke became Chief of the Imperial General Staff in 1941. In that role he focused on strategy and, in particular, on the Mediterranean theatre. Here, his principal aims were to rid North Africa of Axis forces and knock Italy out of the war, thereby opening up the Mediterranean for Allied shipping. This progress in the Mediterranian allowed the cross-Channel invasion from southern England to Normandy in France when the Allies were ready and the Germans sufficiently weakened. He then developed the strategy for pushing back the German forces from Normandy across France and finally into Germany itself. As chairman of the Chiefs of Staff Committee, Brooke was the foremost military advisor to Prime Minister Winston Churchill, and had the role of co-ordinator of the British military efforts in the Allies' victory in 1945.

After retiring from the British Army, Brooke served as Lord High Constable of England during the Coronation of Queen Elizabeth II in 1953. His "war diaries" are famous for their criticism of some of Churchill's policies and for Brooke's forthright views on other leading figures of the war.

== Background and early life ==
Alan Brooke was born on 23 July 1883 at Bagnères-de-Bigorre, Hautes-Pyrénées, to a prominent Anglo-Irish family from West Ulster. The Brookes had a long military tradition as the "Fighting Brookes of Colebrooke", with a history of service in the Wars of the Three Kingdoms, the French Revolutionary and Napoleonic Wars, and World War I. He was the seventh and youngest child of Sir Victor Brooke, 3rd baronet, of Colebrooke Park, Brookeborough, County Fermanagh, and the former Alice Bellingham, second daughter of Sir Alan Bellingham, 3rd Baronet, of Castle Bellingham in County Louth. Brooke's father died when he was just eight years old.

Brooke was educated at a day school in Pau, France, where he lived until the age of 16; he was bi-lingual in French (which he spoke with a heavy Gascon accent and spoke as a first language as a result of his upbringing in the French Pyrenees) and English. He spoke both French and English very fast, leading some Americans later in life to distrust a "fast-talking Limey." He was also fluent in German, and had learnt Urdu and Persian.

Brooke, desiring a military career, "only just" qualified for the Royal Military Academy, Woolwich in 1900, coming sixty-fifth out of seventy-two in the entrance exam, but passed out at seventeenth. Had he done any better he would have qualified for a commission in the Royal Engineers, as was his initial intention, and possibly would not have ended up on the General Staff after the Great War.

Brooke was commissioned into the Royal Regiment of Artillery as a second lieutenant on 24 December 1902. Due to his high placing at Woolwich, Brooke was allowed to choose which branch of the Royal Artillery to join. His choice was the Royal Field Artillery, with which he served in Ireland and India in the years leading up to the outbreak of the First World War in the summer of 1914. He also "received his jacket" (Note: The jacket was decorated with rows of gold braid, hence the expression "getting one's jacket".) upon being selected to join the Royal Horse Artillery.

== First World War ==
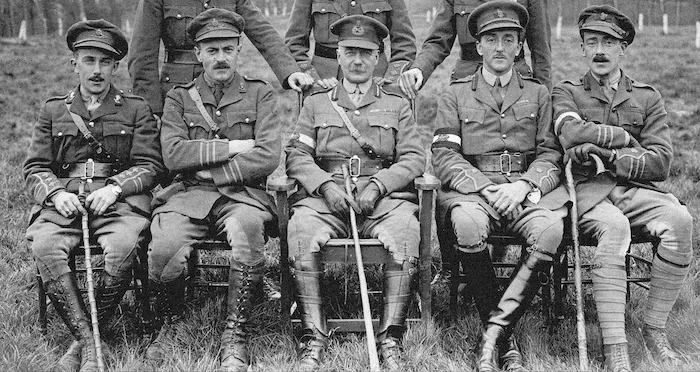
From right to left: Lawrence Cosgrave, Brooke, Edward Morrison and Andrew McNaughton during the First World War

During the war, he was assigned to an ammunition column of the Royal Horse Artillery on the Western Front, where he gained a reputation as an outstanding planner of operations. He later was transferred to the 18th Division. At the Battle of the Somme in 1916, he introduced the French "creeping barrage" system, thereby helping the protection of the advancing infantry from enemy machine gun fire. Brooke was with the Canadian Corps from early 1917 and planned the barrages for the Battle of Vimy Ridge. In 1918 he was appointed GSO1 as the senior artillery staff officer in the First Army. Brooke ended the conflict as a lieutenant-colonel and a Companion of the Distinguished Service Order and Bar and was mentioned in despatches six times.

As with many others of his generation, the war left its mark upon Brooke. In October 1918, shortly before the Armistice of 11 November 1918, he wrote

One trip up to Lens where I wandered among the ruins...such ruin and such desolation. I climbed on to a heap of stones which represents the place where the Church once stood, and I looked down on the wreckage. One could spend days down there just looking down picturing to oneself the tragedies that have occurred in every corner of this place. If the stones could talk and could repeat what they have witnessed, and the thoughts they had read on dying men's faces I wonder if there would ever be any wars.

When the Armistice did eventually arrive Brooke was in London on leave. He watched the crowds of people celebrating but felt mixed feelings, as he himself later wrote:

That wild evening jarred on my feelings. I felt untold relief at the end being there at last, but was swamped with floods of memories of those years of struggle. I was filled with gloom that evening, and retired to bed early.

On 31 March 1942 he wrote:

... on the lack of good military commanders: Half our corps and Divisional Commanders are totally unfit for their appointments, and yet if I was to sack them I could find no better! They lack character, imagination, drive and power of leadership. The reason for this state of affairs is to be found in the losses we sustained in the last war of all our best officers, who should now be our senior commanders.

== Between the wars ==
During the interwar period, Brooke attended the first post-war course at the Staff College, Camberley in 1919. He managed to impress both his fellow students and the college's instructors during the relatively brief time he was there. He then served as a staff officer with the 50th Division from 1920 to 1923. Brooke then returned to Camberley, this time as an instructor, before attending the Imperial Defence College. He was later appointed as an instructor at the college, and while there he became acquainted with most of the officers who became leading British commanders of the Second World War. From 1929 onwards Brooke, promoted on 1 June 1935 to major general, held a number of important appointments: inspector of artillery, director of military training and then general officer commanding (GOC) of the Mobile Division (later the 1st Armoured Division) in 1935. In 1938, on promotion to lieutenant-general, he took command of the Anti-Aircraft Corps (renamed Anti-Aircraft Command in April 1939) and built a strong relationship with Air Chief Marshal Hugh Dowding, the AOC-in-C of Fighter Command, which laid a vital basis of co-operation between the two commands during the Battle of Britain the following year. In July 1939 Brooke moved to command Southern Command. By the outbreak of the Second World War, Brooke was already seen as one of the British Army's foremost generals.

== Second World War ==
=== Commander in Flanders, France and Britain ===
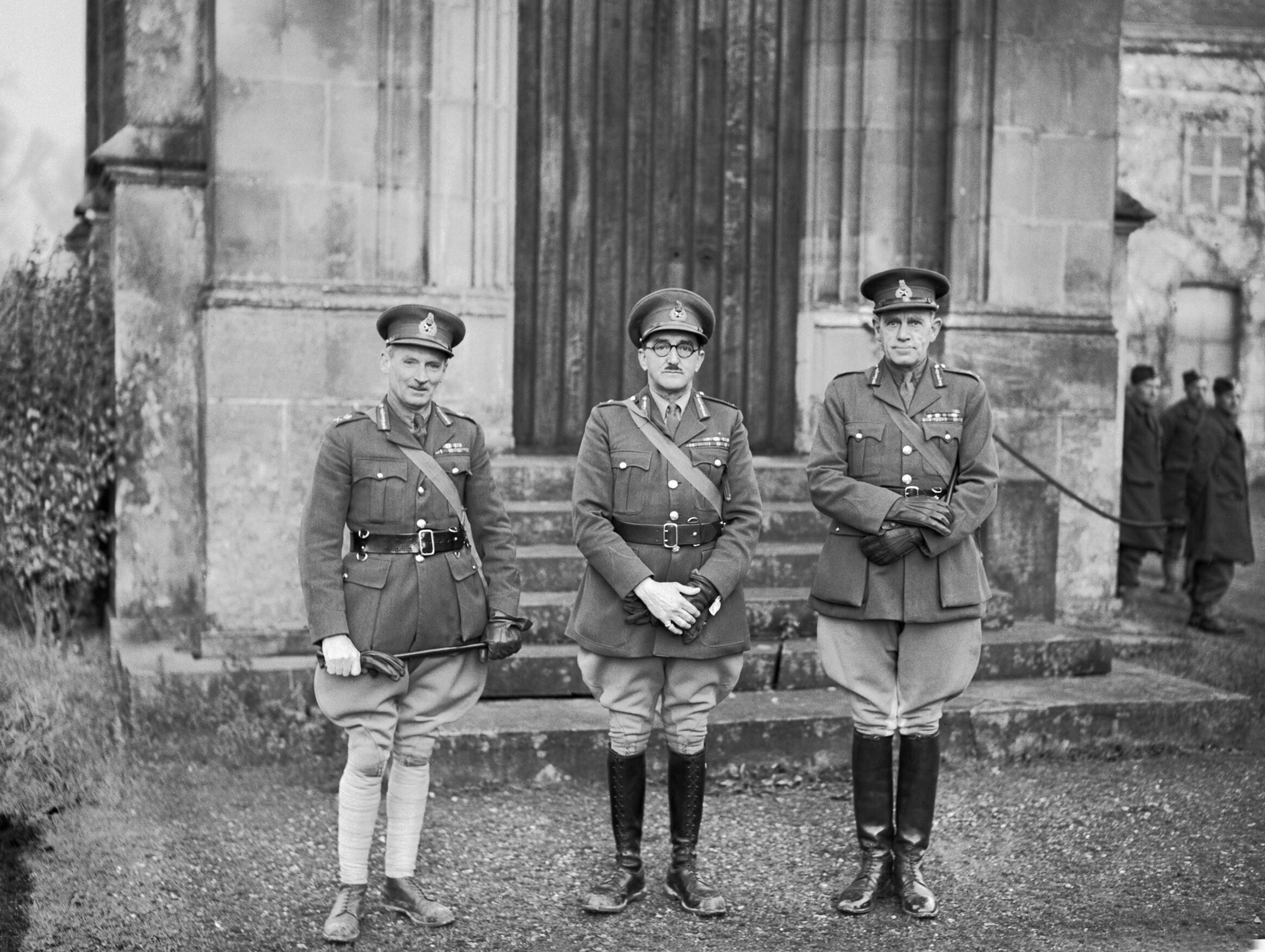
Lieutenant-general Brooke, GOC II Corps, with Major-general Bernard Montgomery, GOC 3rd Division, and Major-general Dudley Johnson, GOC 4th Division, pictured here in either 1939 or 1940.

Following the outbreak of the Second World War, in September 1939, Brooke commanded II Corps in the British Expeditionary Force (BEF)—which included in its subordinate formations the 3rd Infantry Division, commanded by the then Major-general Bernard Montgomery, as well as Major-general Dudley Johnson's 4th Infantry Division. As corps commander, Brooke had a pessimistic view of the Allies' chances of countering a German offensive. He was sceptical of the quality and determination of the French Army, and of the Belgian Army. This scepticism appeared to be justified when he was on a visit to some French front-line units and was shocked to see unshaven men, ungroomed horses and dirty vehicles.

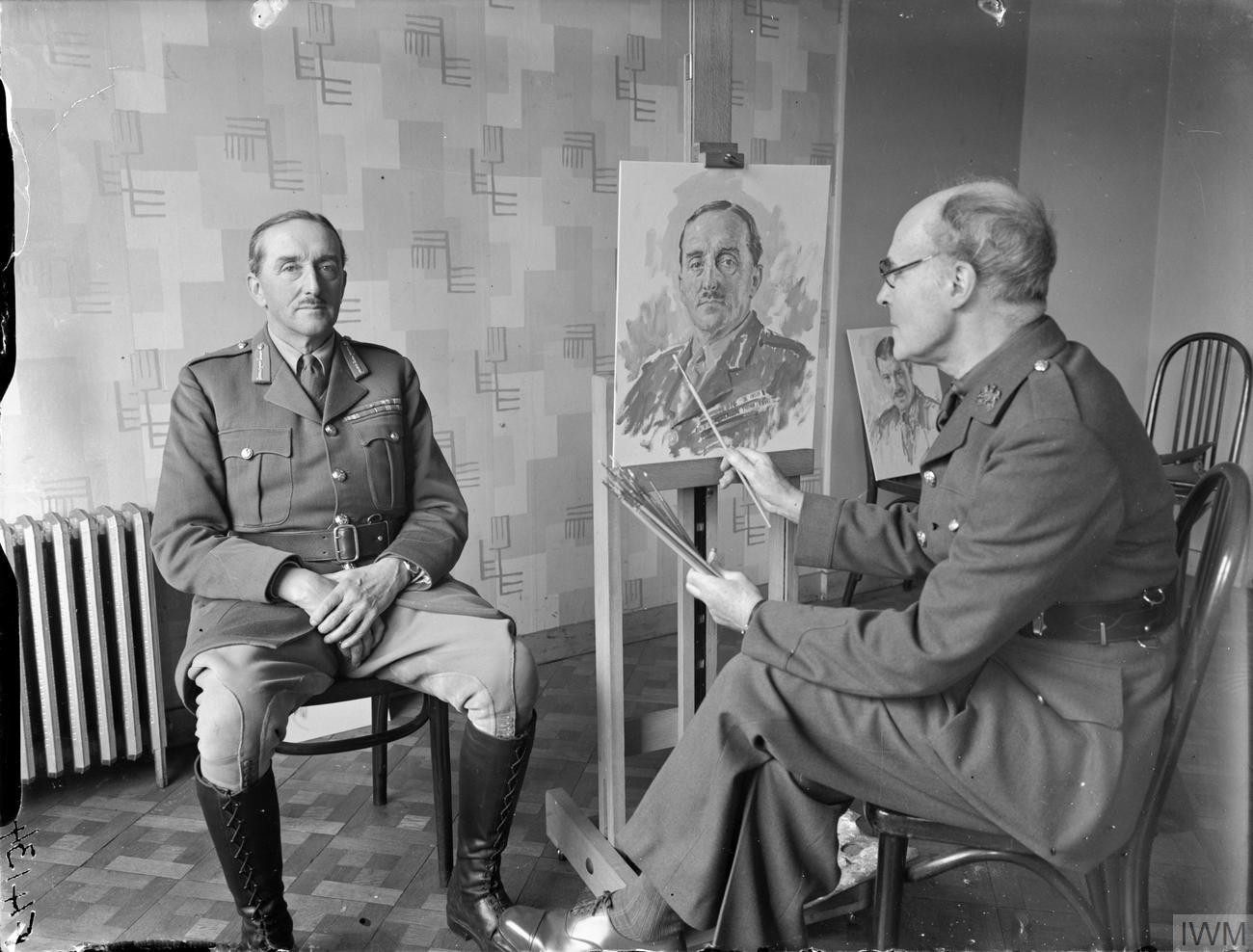
Lieutenant-general Sir Alan Brooke sits for a portrait being painted by Reginald Eves, 30 April 1940.

He had also little trust in Lord Gort, commander-in-chief of the BEF, who Brooke thought took too much interest in details while being incapable of taking a broad strategic view. Gort, on the other hand, regarded Brooke as a pessimist who failed to spread confidence, and was thinking of replacing him. Brooke correctly predicted that the Allied powers' Plan D envisioning an advance along the Meuse would allow the Wehrmacht to outflank them, but British High Command dismissed his warnings as defeatist.

When the German offensive began, Brooke, aided by Neil Ritchie, his Brigadier General Staff (BGS), distinguished himself in the handling of the British forces in the retreat to Dunkirk. His II Corps faced rapid German Army armoured advances following the Allied defeat at the Battle of Sedan. In late May 1940 it held off the major German attack on the Ypres-Comines Canal but then found its left flank exposed by the capitulation of the Belgian army. Brooke swiftly ordered Montgomery's 3rd Division to switch from the Corps' right flank to cover the gap. This was accomplished in a complicated night-time manoeuvre. Pushing more troops north to counter the threat to the embarking troops at the Dunkirk evacuation from German units advancing along the coast, II Corps retreated to their appointed places on the east or south-east of the shrinking perimeter of Dunkirk. Brooke's actions not only saved his own forces from capitulation, but prevented the Germans from seizing the 20-mile gap left by the Belgian surrender and capturing the entire BEF before it could safely evacuate.

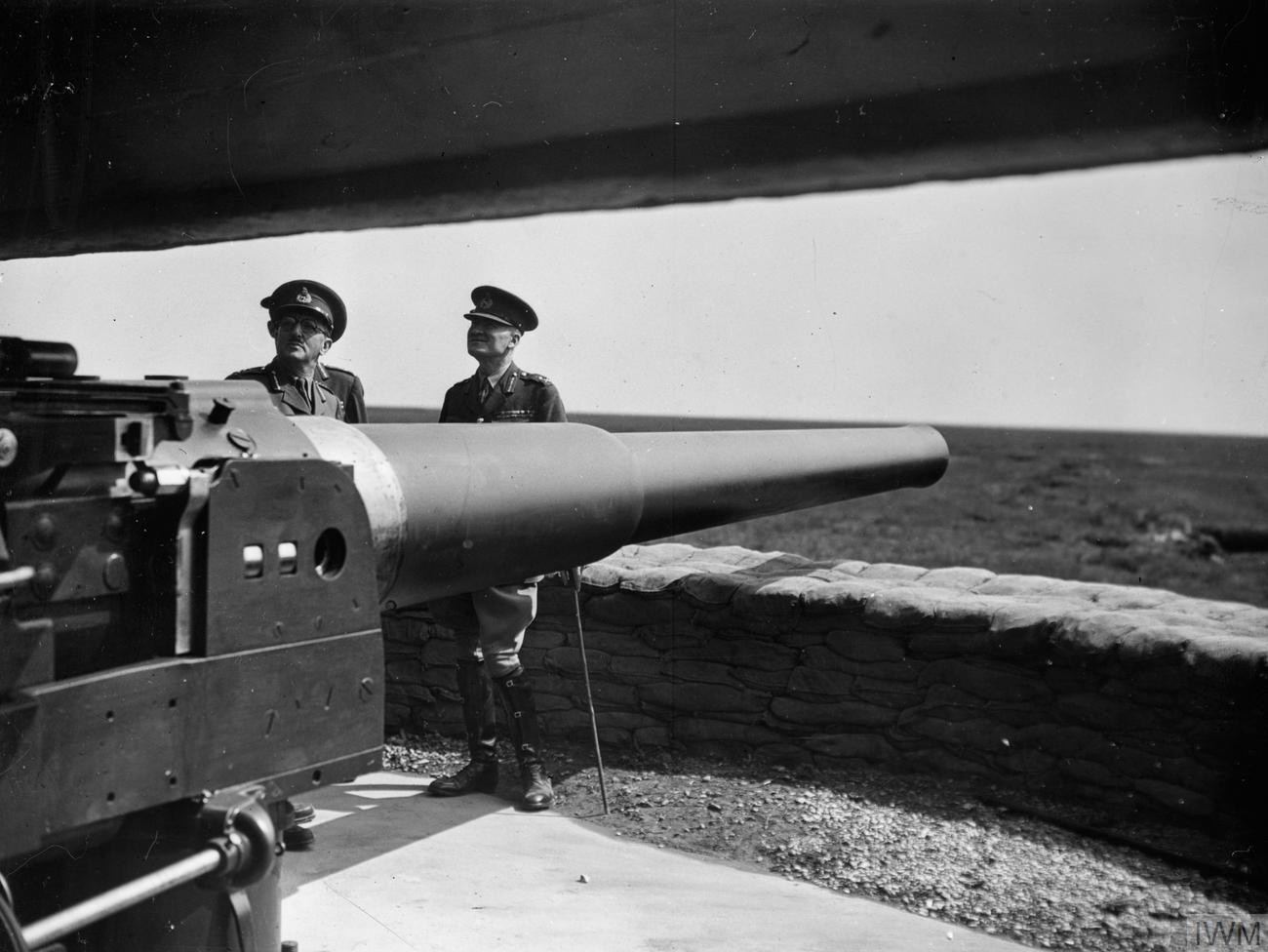
The C-in-C Home Forces, General Sir Alan Brooke (left), during a visit to Northern Command with General Sir Ronald Adam (right), conferring around a 6-inch coastal defence gun, 6 August 1940.

Then on 29 May Brooke was ordered by Gort to return to England, leaving the corps in Montgomery's hands. According to Montgomery, Brooke was so overcome with emotion at having to leave his men in such a crisis that "he broke down and wept" as he handed over to Montgomery on the beaches of La Panne. He was told by Gort to "proceed home ... for (the) task of reforming new armies" and so returned on a destroyer (30 May). Then "on June 2nd set out for the War Office to find out what I was wanted for" with a "light heart" and with no responsibility, and was then told by John Dill (CIGS) that he was to "return to France to form a new BEF"; he later said that hearing the command from Dill was "one of his blackest (moments) in the war". He had already realised that there was no hope of success for the "Brittany plan" (Breton redoubt) to keep an allied redoubt in France. After General Maxime Weygand warned him that the French Army was collapsing and could offer no further resistance, he decided that he needed to convince his superiors to allow him to withdraw his forces to Cherbourg and Brest for evacuation to Britain. He told Secretary of State for War Anthony Eden that the mission had "no military value and no hope of success" although he could not comment on its political value. In his first conversation with Prime Minister Winston Churchill (Brooke had been rung by Dill who was at 10 Downing Street) he insisted that all British forces should be withdrawn from France. Churchill initially objected but was eventually convinced by Brooke; around 200,000 British and Allied troops were successfully evacuated from ports in northwestern France.

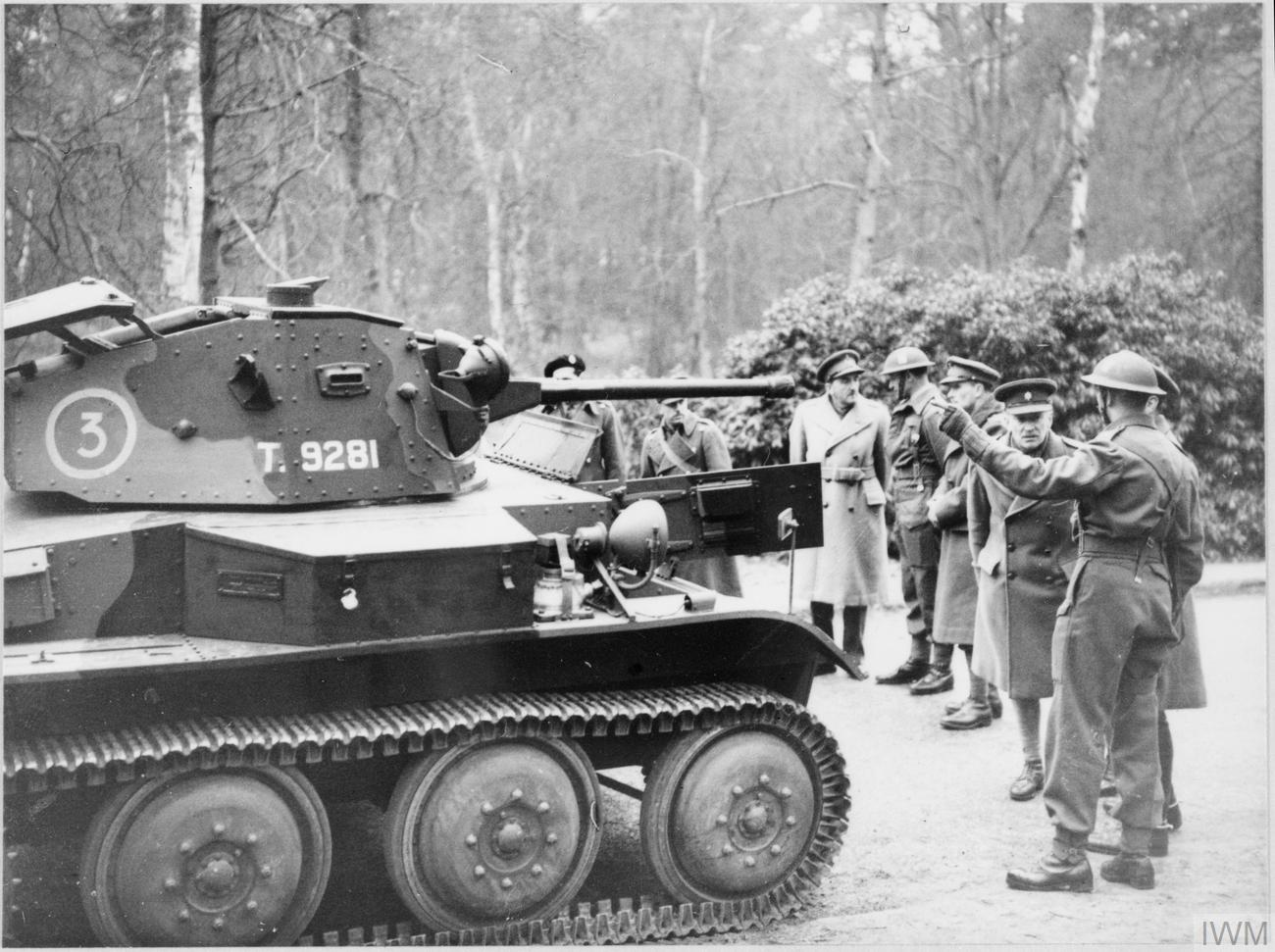
General Sir Alan Brooke, C-in-C Home Forces (fifth from right, facing camera) inspecting a Tetrarch light tank at the Staff College, Camberley, 6 January 1941.

=== Home Forces ===
After returning for a short spell at Southern Command Brooke was appointed in July 1940 Commander-in-Chief, Home Forces, with orders to take charge of anti-invasion preparations. Thus it would have been Brooke's task to direct the land battle in the event of a German amphibious invasion of Great Britain. Contrary to his predecessor General Sir Edmund Ironside, who favoured a static coastal defence, Brooke developed a mobile reserve which was to swiftly counterattack the enemy forces before they were established. A light line of defence on the coast was to assure that the landings were delayed as much as possible. Writing after the war, Brooke acknowledged that he also "had every intention of using sprayed mustard gas on the beaches".

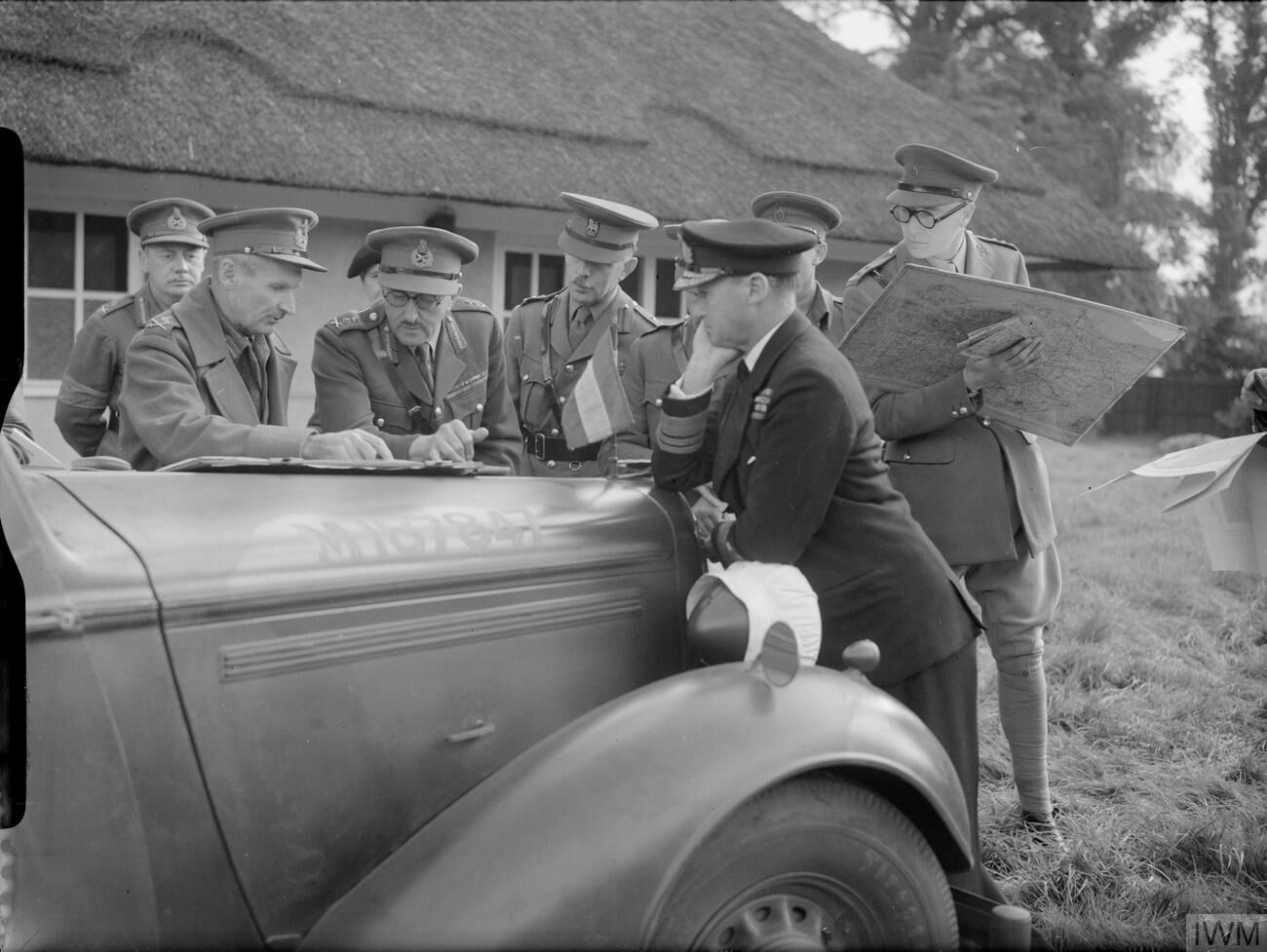
Senior officers discuss operations during Exercise 'Bumper', 2 October 1941. On the left, the Chief Umpire, Lieutenant-General Bernard Montgomery, talks to the C-in-C Home Forces (soon CIGS), General Sir Alan Brooke.

Brooke believed that the lack of a unified command of the three services was "a grave danger" to the defence of the country. Despite this, and the fact that the available forces never reached the numbers he thought were required, Brooke considered the situation far from "helpless" if the Germans were to invade. "We should certainly have a desperate struggle and the future might well have hung in the balance, but I certainly felt that given a fair share of the fortunes of war we should certainly succeed in finally defending these shores", he wrote after the war. But in the end, the German invasion plan was never taken beyond the preliminary assembly of forces.

=== Chief of the Imperial General Staff ===
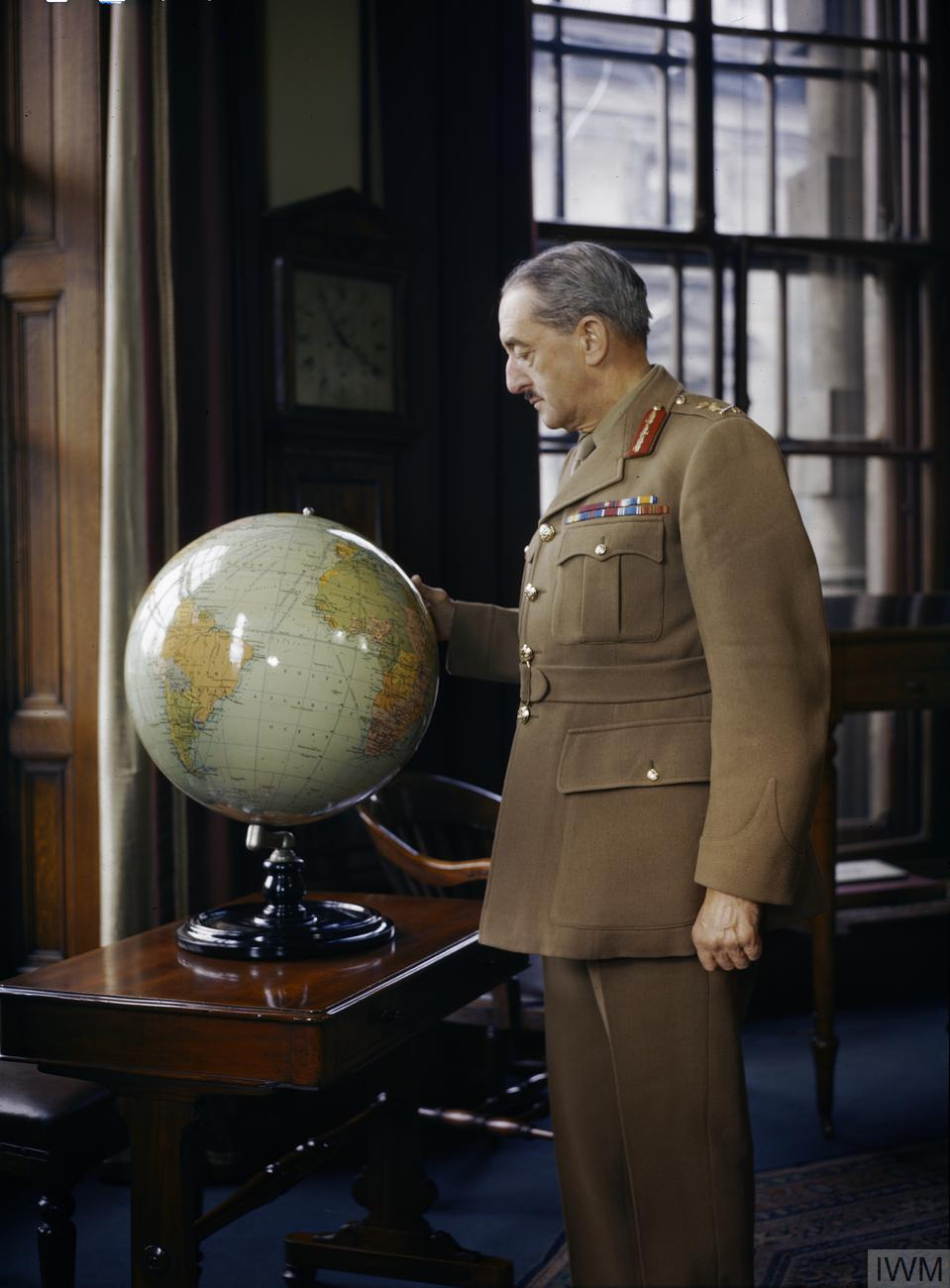
General Sir Alan Brooke looking at a globe at his desk in the War Office in London, pictured here sometime in 1942.

In December 1941 Brooke succeeded Field Marshal Sir John Dill as Chief of the Imperial General Staff (CIGS), the professional head of the British Army, in which appointment he also represented the British Army on the Chiefs of Staff Committee.

In March 1942 he succeeded Admiral of the Fleet Sir Dudley Pound as chairman of the Chiefs of Staff Committee.

As CIGS, Brooke was the functional head of the British Army, and as chairman of the Chiefs of Staff Committee, which he dominated by force of intellect and personality, he took the leading military part in the overall strategic direction of the British war effort. In 1942, Brooke joined the Western Allies' ultimate command, the U.S.-British Combined Chiefs of Staff.

Despite the traditional distrust that had existed between the military and the political side of the War Office, he got along quite well with his political counterpart, the Secretary of State for War, first the Conservative politician David Margesson and later Sir James Grigg, the former head civil servant of the department, who in an unusual move was promoted to the ministerial post.

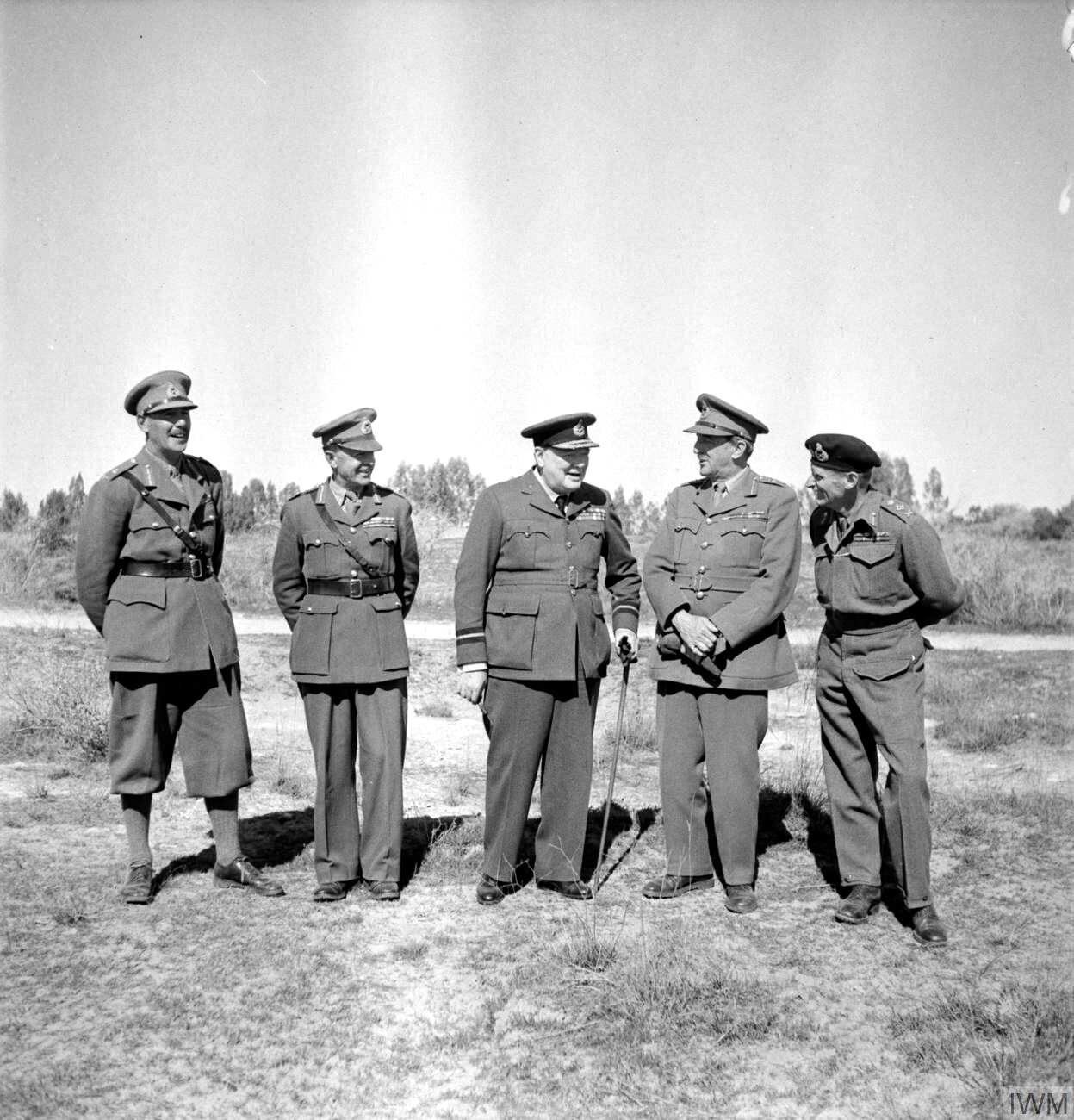
The Prime Minister, Mr Winston Churchill with military leaders during his visit to Tripoli, 1943. The group includes: Lieutenant-general Sir Oliver Leese, General Sir Harold Alexander, General Sir Alan Brooke and General Sir Bernard Montgomery.

Brooke's focus was primarily on his Mediterranean strategy for the Mediterranean theatre. Here, his principal aims were to rid North Africa of Axis forces and knock Italy out of the war, thereby opening up the Mediterranean for Allied shipping. Later, to mount the cross-Channel invasion when the Allies were ready and the Germans sufficiently weakened.

Brooke's and the British view of the Mediterranean operations contrasted with the American commitment to an early invasion of western Europe, which led to several heated arguments at conferences of the Combined Chiefs of Staff.

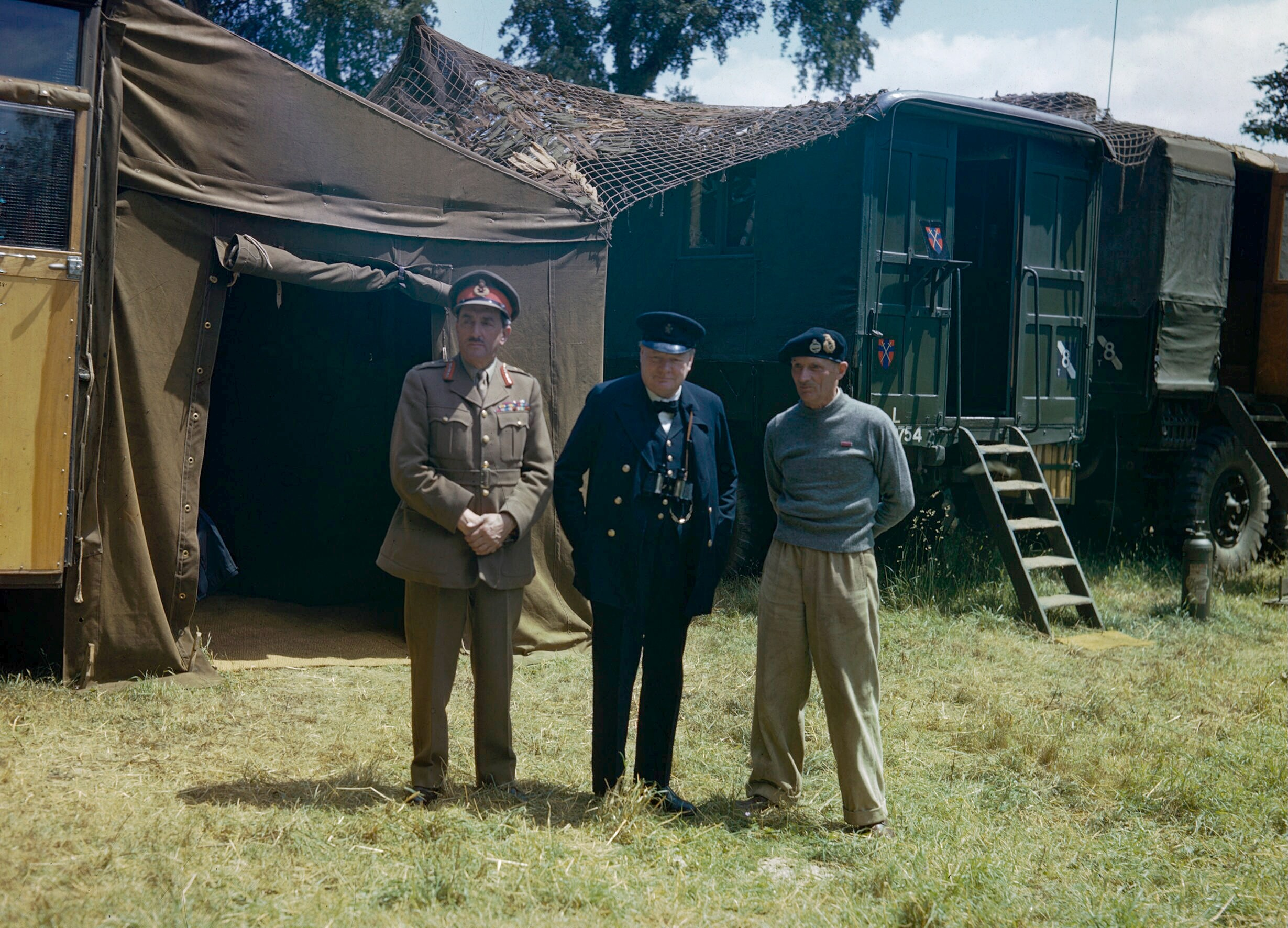
Brooke (on the left) and Churchill visit Bernard Montgomery's mobile headquarters in Normandy, France, shortly after the Normandy landings, 12 June 1944.

At the Casablanca Conference in January 1943, it was decided that the Allies should invade Sicily, under the command of General Dwight D. Eisenhower, a decision that effectively postponed the planned invasion of Western Europe until 1944. The Casablanca agreement was in fact a compromise, brokered largely by Brooke's old friend Field Marshal Sir John Dill, Chief of the British Joint Staff Mission in Washington, D.C. "I owe him [Dill] an unbounded debt of gratitude for his help on that occasion and in many other similar ones", Brooke wrote after the war.

The post of CIGS was less publicised than command of an important theatre of war, an example being the many press releases on General Montgomery but few, if any, about the CIGS. However, the CIGS chose the generals who commanded the operational theatres and decided what men and munitions they should have. When it came to finding the right commanders he often complained that many officers who would have been good commanders had been killed in the First World War and that this was one reason behind the difficulties the British had in the beginning of the war. When General Sir Claude Auchinleck was to be replaced as the commander of the British Eighth Army in 1942, Brooke preferred Lieutenant-general Bernard Montgomery (Montgomery was both Brooke's ex-pupil and his protégé) instead of Lieutenant-general William Gott, who was Churchill's candidate. Soon thereafter Gott was killed when his aircraft was shot down and Montgomery received the command. Brooke would later reflect upon the tragic event which led to the appointment of Montgomery as an intervention by God.

A few days earlier Brooke had been offered Auchinleck's main job of Commander-in-Chief Middle East. Brooke declined, believing he now knew better than any other general how to deal with Churchill. He recorded that it would take a new CIGS six months to learn to handle Churchill, and "during those six months anything might happen".

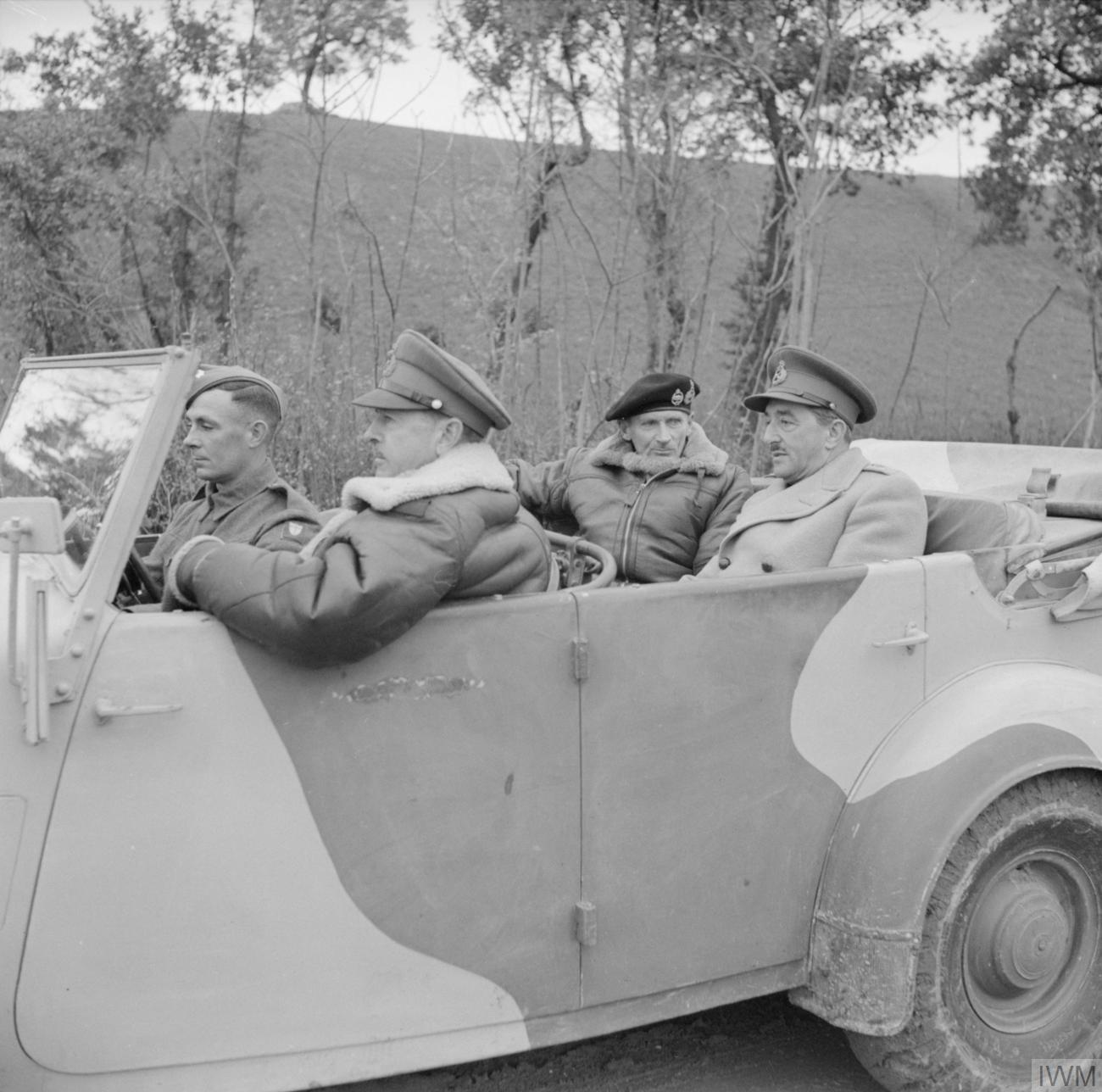
General Sir Bernard Montgomery in his staff car with General Sir Harold Alexander and General Sir Alan Brooke, during an inspection of the 8th Indian Division HQ, Italy, 15 December 1943.

A year later, the war had taken a different turn and Brooke no longer believed it necessary to stay at Churchill's side. He therefore looked forward to taking command of the Allied invasion of Western Europe, a post Brooke believed he had been promised by Churchill on three occasions. During the first Quebec Conference in August 1943, it was decided that the command would go to General George Marshall. (Although in the event Marshall's work as U.S. Army Chief of Staff was too important for him to leave Washington, D.C., and Dwight Eisenhower was appointed instead.) Brooke was disappointed, both at being passed over and of the way the decision was conveyed to him by Churchill, who according to Brooke "dealt with the matter as if it were one of minor importance".

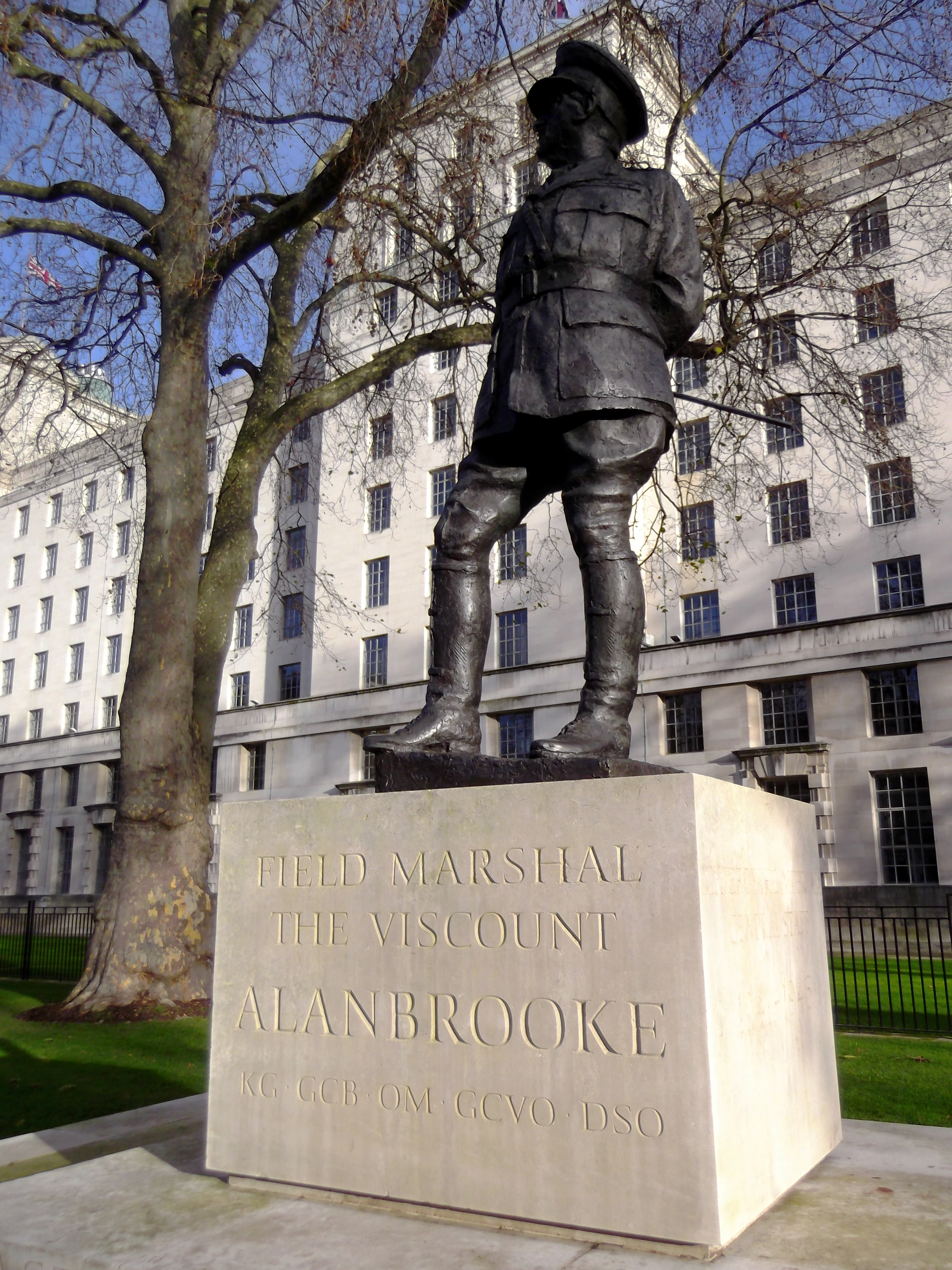
Statue of Field Marshal The Viscount Alanbrooke, Ministry of Defence Building, Whitehall, London.

Brooke or "Brookie" as he was often known, is reckoned to be one of the foremost of all the heads of the British Army. He was quick in mind and speech and deeply respected by his military colleagues, both British and Allied, although his uncompromising style could make the Americans wary.

As CIGS, Brooke had a strong influence on the grand strategy of the Western Allies. The war in the west unfolded more or less according to his plans, at least until 1943 when the American forces were still relatively small in comparison to the British. Among the most crucial of his contributions was his opposition to an early landing in France, which was important for delaying Operation Overlord until June 1944.

He was a cautious general with a great respect for the German war machine. Some American planners thought that Brooke's participation in the campaigns of the First World War and in the two evacuations from France in the Second World War made him lack the aggression they believed necessary for victory. According to historian Max Hastings, Brooke's reputation as a strategist was "significantly damaged" by his remarks at the Trident Conference in Washington in May 1943, where he claimed that no major operations on the continent would be possible until 1945 or 1946. His diary says that he wanted "operations in the Mediterranean to force a dispersal of German forces, help Russia, and thus eventually produce a situation where cross Channel operations are possible" but that Churchill "entirely repudiated" (or half repudiated) the paper we (the CCOS) had agreed on; Harry Hopkins got him to withdraw his proposed amendments but that Churchill had aroused suspicions with his talk of "ventures in the Balkans."

=== Relationship with Churchill ===
During the years as CIGS, Brooke had a stormy relationship with Winston Churchill. Brooke was often frustrated with the Prime Minister's habits and working methods, his abuse of generals and constant meddling in strategic matters. At the same time Brooke greatly admired Churchill for the way he inspired the Allied cause and for the way he bore the heavy burden of war leadership. In one typical passage in Brooke's war diaries Churchill is described as a "genius mixed with an astonishing lack of vision – he is quite the most difficult man to work with that I have ever struck but I should not have missed the chance of working with him for anything on earth!"

Shortly after the Japanese attack on Pearl Harbor, Churchill and his senior military staff used the Arcadia Conference in Washington to decide the general strategy for the war. The American Army Chief of Staff George C. Marshall came up with the idea of a Combined Chiefs of Staff that would make final military decisions (subject to approval by President Roosevelt and Churchill). Marshall sold it to Roosevelt and together the two sold the idea to Churchill. Churchill's military aides were much less favourable, and Brooke was strongly opposed. However, Brooke was left behind in London to handle the daily details of running the British war effort, and was not consulted. The combined board was permanently stationed in Washington, where Field Marshal Dill represented the British half. The Combined Board did have thirteen in-person full meetings, which Brooke attended.

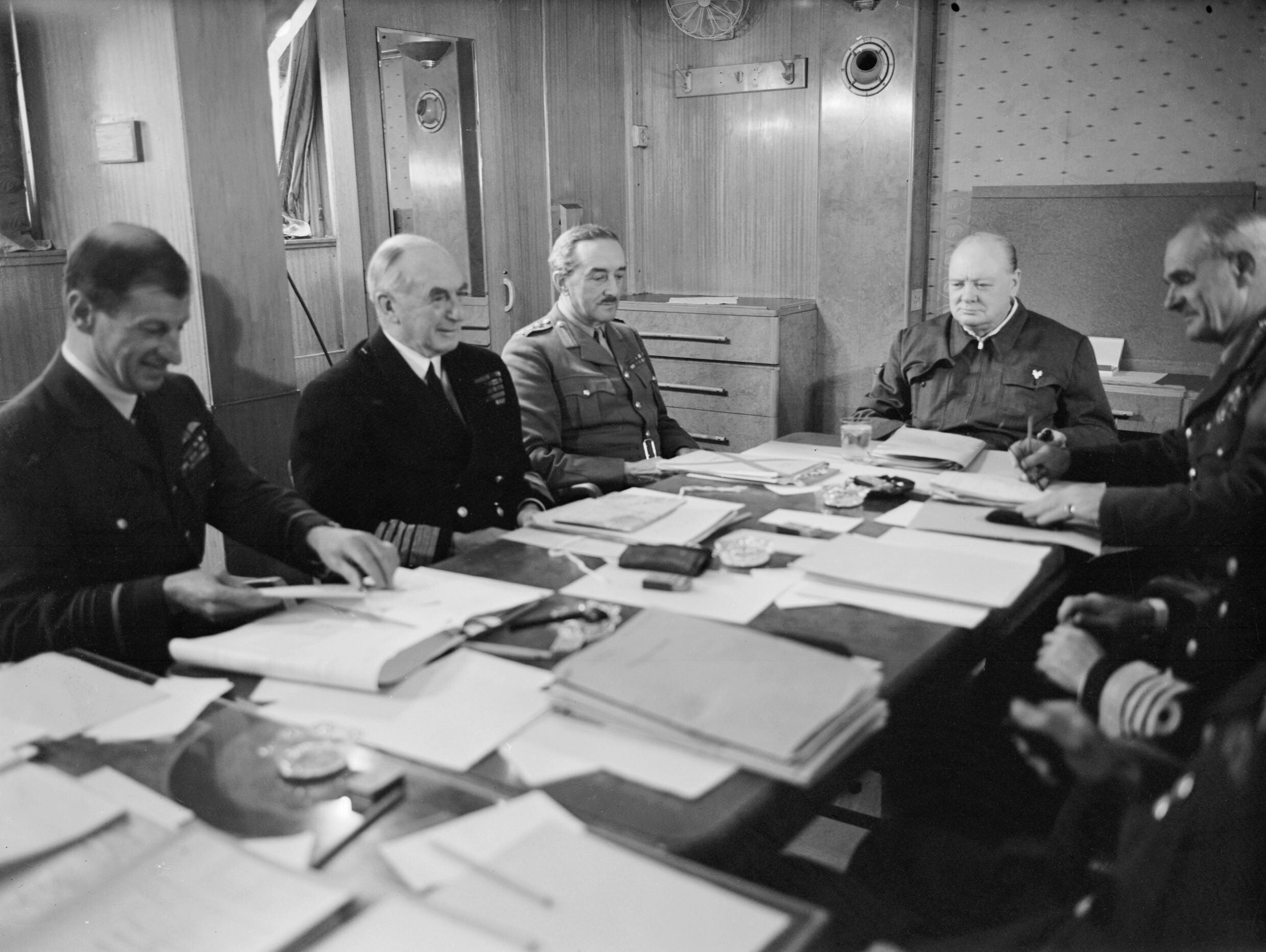
Seated in May 1943 around a conference table aboard the RMS Queen Mary are, left to right: Air Chief Marshal Sir Charles Portal, Admiral of the Fleet Sir Dudley Pound, General Sir Alan Brooke, Winston Churchill.

When Churchill's many fanciful strategic ideas collided with sound military strategy it was only Brooke on the Chiefs of Staff Committee who was able to stand up to the Prime Minister. Churchill said about Brooke: "When I thump the table and push my face towards him what does he do? Thumps the table harder and glares back at me. I know these Brookes – stiff-necked Ulstermen and there's no one worse to deal with than that!" It has been claimed that part of Churchill's greatness was that he appointed Brooke as CIGS and kept him for the whole war.

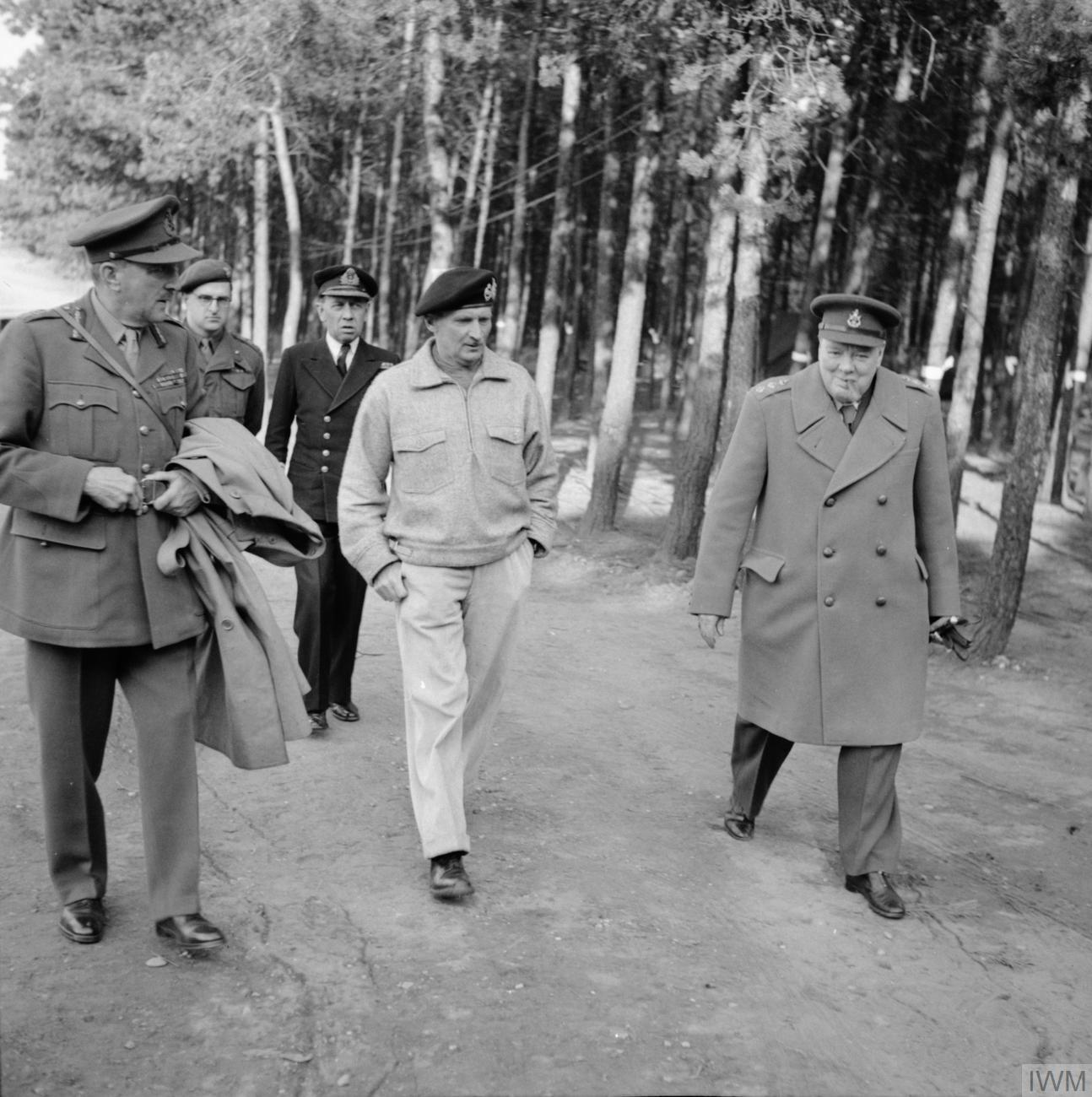
Winston Churchill with Field Marshal Sir Bernard Montgomery and Field Marshal Sir Alan Brooke during the Prime Minister's tour of troops taking part in the Rhine crossing, 25 March 1945.

Brooke was particularly annoyed by Churchill's idea of capturing the northern tip of Sumatra. But in some cases Brooke did not see the political dimension of strategy as the Prime Minister did. The CIGS was sceptical about the British intervention in the Greek Civil War in late 1944 (during the Dekemvriana), believing this was an operation which would drain troops from the central front in Germany. But at this stage the war was practically won and Churchill saw the possibility of preventing Greece from becoming a communist state.

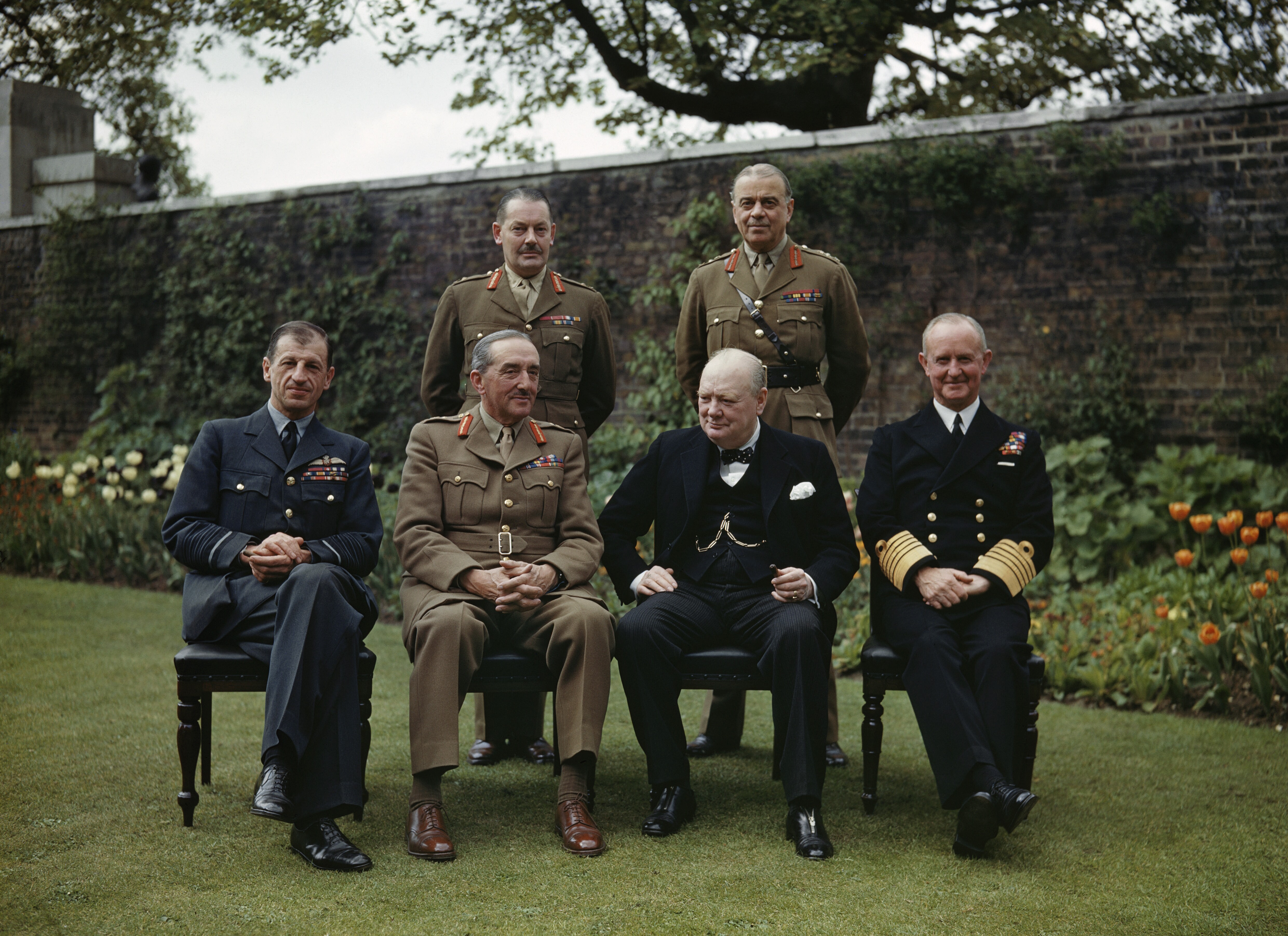
Winston Churchill with his Chiefs of Staff in the garden of 10 Downing Street, 7 May 1945. Seated, left to right: Air Chief Marshal Sir Charles Portal; Field Marshal Sir Alan Brooke; Winston Churchill; Admiral of the Fleet Sir Andrew Cunningham. Standing, left to right: Major-general Leslie Hollis; General Sir Hastings Ismay.

The balance of the Chiefs of Staff Committee was tilted in October 1943 when Admiral Sir Dudley Pound, Brooke's predecessor as chairman, retired as a result of poor health and Admiral Sir Andrew Cunningham succeeded Pound as First Sea Lord and naval representative on the Chiefs of Staff Committee. Brooke as a consequence got a firm ally in his arguments with Churchill. This was reflected in the most serious clash between the Prime Minister and the Chiefs of Staff, regarding the British preparations for final stages of the Pacific War. Brooke and the rest of the chiefs of staff wanted to build up the forces in Australia, while Churchill preferred to use India as a base for the British effort. It was an issue over which the chiefs of staff were prepared to resign, but in the end a compromise was reached.

Despite their many disagreements Brooke and Churchill held an affection for each other. After one fierce clash Churchill told his chief of staff and military adviser, General Sir Hastings Ismay, that he did not think he could continue to work any longer with Brooke because "he hates me. I can see hatred looking from his eyes." Brooke responded to Ismay: "Hate him? I don't hate him. I love him. But the first time I tell him that I agree with him when I don't will be the time to get rid of me, for then I can be no more use to him." When Churchill was told this he murmured, "Dear Brookie."

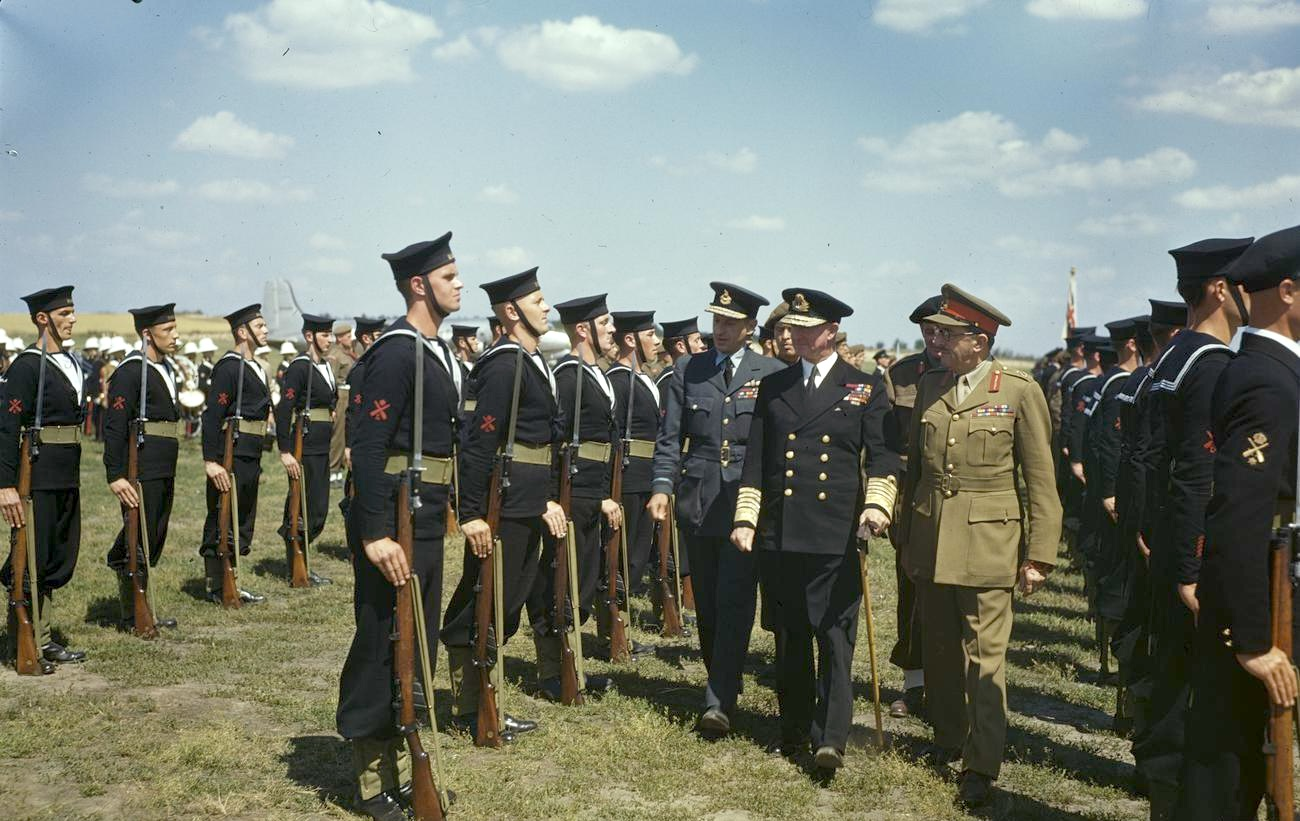
The chiefs of staff, Air Marshal Sir Charles Portal, Admiral Sir Andrew Cunningham and Field Marshal Sir Alan Brooke, inspect a Naval Guard of Honour at the airport in Berlin before the start of the Potsdam Conference, July 1945.

The partnership between Brooke and Churchill was a very successful one. According to historian Max Hastings, their partnership "created the most efficient machine for the higher direction of the war possessed by any combatant nation, even if its judgments were sometimes flawed and its ability to enforce its wishes increasingly constrained".

Brooke's diary entry for 10 September 1944 is particularly revealing of his ambivalent relationship with Churchill:

...And the wonderful thing is that 3/4 of the population of the world imagine that Churchill is one of the Strategists of History, a second Marlborough, and the other 1/4 have no idea what a public menace he is and has been throughout this war! It is far better that the world should never know, and never suspect the feet of clay of this otherwise superhuman being. Without him England was lost for a certainty, with him England has been on the verge of disaster time and again.... Never have I admired and despised a man simultaneously to the same extent. Never have such opposite extremes been combined in the same human being.

== War diaries ==
Brooke kept a diary during the whole of the Second World War. Originally intended for his wife, Benita, the diaries were later expanded on by Lord Alanbrooke, as he had become, in the 1950s. They contain descriptions on the day-to-day running of the British war effort (including some indiscreet references to top secret interceptions of German radio traffic), Brooke's thoughts on strategy, as well as frequent anecdotes from the many meetings he had with the Allied leadership during the war.

The diaries have become famous mostly because of the frequent remarks on and criticisms of Churchill. Although the diaries contain passages expressing admiration of Churchill, they also served as a vent for Brooke's frustration with working with the Prime Minister. The diaries also give sharp opinions on several of the top Allied leaders. The American generals Eisenhower and Marshall, for example, are described as poor strategists and Field Marshal Sir Harold Alexander as unintelligent. Among the few individuals of whom Brooke seems to have kept consistently positive opinions, from a military standpoint, were Field Marshal Bernard Montgomery, General of the Army Douglas MacArthur, Field Marshal Sir John Dill, and Joseph Stalin. Brooke admired Stalin for his quick brain and grasp of military strategy. Otherwise he had no illusions about the man, describing Stalin thus: "He has got an unpleasantly cold, crafty, dead face, and whenever I look at him I can imagine his sending off people to their doom without ever turning a hair."

The first (abridged and censored) version published in the 1950s was edited by the distinguished historian Sir Arthur Bryant: 1957 (The Turn of the Tide) and 1959 (Triumph in the West). Originally Brooke intended that the diaries were never to be published but one reason that he changed his mind was the lack of credit to him and the Chiefs of Staff in Churchill's own war memoirs, which essentially presented their ideas and innovations as the Prime Minister's own. Although censorship and libel laws accounted for numerous suppressions of what Brooke had originally written concerning persons who were still alive, the Bryant books became controversial even in their truncated state, mainly as a result of the comments on Churchill, Marshall, Eisenhower, Gort, and others. Churchill himself did not appreciate the books. In 1952, both Churchill and Lord Beaverbrook threatened legal action against a biography of Stanley Baldwin by G. M. Young, and a settlement was reached by lawyer Arnold Goodman to remove the offending sentences. Publisher Rupert Hart-Davis had the "hideously expensive" job of removing and replacing seven leaves from 7,580 copies of the biography. Diary entries also refer to intercepts of German signals decrypted at Bletchley Park (which Brooke visited twice), which were secret until 1974.

In 2001, Alex Danchev of Keele University and Daniel Todman of Cambridge University published an unexpurgated version of the Brooke Diaries including original critical remarks that Brooke made at various times that had been suppressed in the Bryant versions. Danchev and Todman also criticised Bryant's editing, but this is balanced by an assessment by Dr Christopher Harmon, advisor to the Churchill Centre and Professor at the US Marine Corps University. Bryant was inhibited by Lord Alanbrooke's desire not to publish in full his critical diary entries about people who were still alive when Bryant's books were published.

== Post-war career ==
Following the Second World War and his retirement from the regular army, Lord Alanbrooke, as he was now, who could have chosen almost any honorary position he wanted, chose to be the colonel commandant of the Honourable Artillery Company. He held this position from 1946 to 1954. In addition, he served on the boards of several companies, both in industry and in banking. He was director of the Anglo-Iranian Oil Company, the Midland Bank, the National Discount Company and the Belfast Banking Company. Alanbrooke was particularly fond of being a director of the Hudson's Bay Company where he served for eleven years from 1948.

According to historian Andrew Sangster, there was a reason for his choice to work in the private sector - i.e. not to stay in the military. Lord Alanbrooke ended the Second World War not well off: he had to move from his house and publishing his memoirs helped because such books sold well at that time.

== Marriages and children ==
Lord Alanbrooke was married twice. After six years of engagement, in 1914 he married Jane Richardson, daughter of Colonel John Mervyn Ashdall Carleton Richardson, a neighbour who lived at Rossfad, County Fermanagh, Ulster. Six days into their honeymoon, the then Alan Brooke was recalled to active duty when the First World War started. The couple had one daughter and one son:

- Rosemary Brooke (25 October 1918 – 2016)
- Thomas Brooke, 2nd Viscount Alanbrooke (9 January 1920 – 19 December 1972)

Jane Brooke died of complications from an operation to repair a broken vertebra following a car accident in 1925 in which her husband was at the steering wheel. Jane's death deeply affected Brooke, who blamed himself for the accident and felt guilt over it for the rest of his life.

Brooke married secondly Benita Lees (1892–1968), daughter of Sir Harold Pelly, 4th Baronet and the widow of Sir Thomas Lees, 2nd Baronet, in 1929. The marriage was very happy for the uxorious Brooke. They too had a daughter and a son:

- Kathleen Benita Brooke (23 January 1931 – 20 November 1961)
- Alan Victor Harold Brooke, 3rd and last Viscount Alanbrooke (24 November 1932 – 10 January 2018)

During the war the couple lived in Hartley Wintney in Hampshire. After the war, their financial situation forced the couple to move into the gardener's cottage of their former home, where they lived for the rest of their lives. Their last years were darkened by the death of their daughter, Kathleen, in a riding accident in 1961.

== Interests ==
Lord Alanbrooke had a love of nature. Hunting and fishing were among his great interests. His foremost passion, however, was birds. He was a noted ornithologist, especially in bird photography. In 1944, he ordered the RAF not to use an island off the coast of Norfolk as a bombing range because of its significance to nesting roseate terns. He was president of the Zoological Society of London between 1950 and 1954, and vice-president of the Royal Society for the Protection of Birds (RSPB) between 1949 and 1961. He was an honorary member of the Royal Photographic Society from February 1954 until his death.

== Death ==
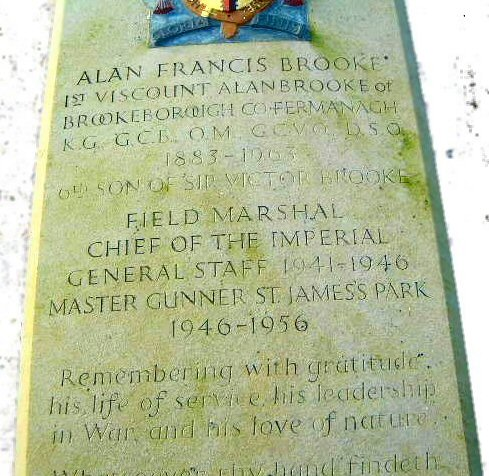
Lord Alanbrooke's gravestone

On 17 June 1963, Lord Alanbrooke suffered a heart attack and died quietly in his bed with his wife beside him. The same day, he had been due to attend the Garter Service in St George's Chapel, Windsor Castle. Nine days later he was given a funeral in Windsor and buried in St Mary's Church, Hartley Wintney. He was succeeded in the viscountcy and barony by his elder son, Thomas.

== Honours ==
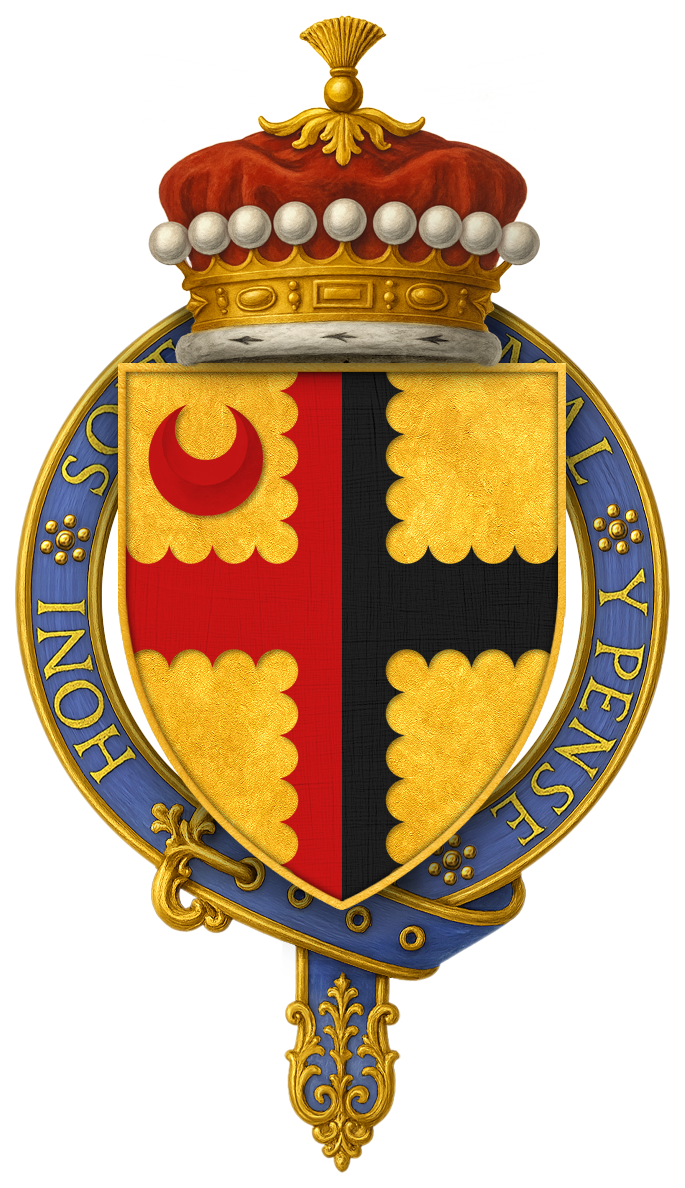
Garter-encircled Shield of Arms of Alan Brooke, 1st Viscount Alanbrooke, KG, GCB, OM, GCVO, DSO & Bar

=== United Kingdom ===
Brooke was created Baron Alanbrooke, of Brookeborough in the County of Fermanagh, in 1945, and Viscount Alanbrooke, of Brookeborough in the County of Fermanagh, in 1946. Other awards included:

- Knight of the Garter (KG) in 1946
- Knight Grand Cross of the Order of the Bath (GCB) in 1942
  - Knight Commander of the Order of the Bath (KCB) in 1940
    - Companion of the Order of the Bath (CB) in 1937
- Member of the Order of Merit (OM) in 1946
- Knight Grand Cross of the Royal Victorian Order (GCVO) in 1953
- Companion of the Distinguished Service Order in 1916 and Bar in 1918
- Aide-de-Camp General to the King, 1944 to 1946
- Colonel Commandant The Glider Pilot Regiment 1942–1951
- Colonel Commandant Honourable Artillery Company 1946–1954
- Master Gunner, St. James's Park, the ceremonial head of the Royal Regiment of Artillery 1946–1956
- Constable of the Tower of London, 1950–1955
- Colonel Commandant Royal Artillery 19??–1957
- Deputy Lieutenant County of Southampton and the Town of Southampton 1950
- Lord Lieutenant of the County of London 1950–1957

Lord Alanbrooke also served as Chancellor of Queen's University Belfast from 1949 until his death. At the Coronation of Queen Elizabeth II he was appointed Lord High Constable of England, thus commanding all troops taking part in the event. In 1993, a statue of Field Marshal Lord Alanbrooke was erected in front of the Ministry of Defence in Whitehall in London. The statue is flanked by statues of Britain's other two leading generals of the Second World War, William Slim and Bernard Montgomery.

=== Foreign decorations ===
- Order of Polonia Restituta 1st Class (Poland) (1943)
- Order of Suvorov 1st Class (USSR) (1944)
- Grand Cordon of the Order of Leopold with Palm (Belgium) (1946)
- Croix de Guerre 1940 with Palm (Belgium) (1946)
- Military Order of the White Lion (Czechoslovakia) (1946)
- Grand Cross of the Order of the Redeemer (Greece) (1946)
- Knight Grand Cross of the Order of the Netherlands Lion (1948)
- Croix de guerre (Belgium) (1918)
- Grand Cross of the Order of Christ (Portugal) (1955)

=== Coat of arms ===
His coat of arms as issued to him by the College of Arms is: "Or, a cross engrailed per pale Gules and Sable, in dexter chief a crescent for difference."

== Memorials ==
- Welbeck College and the Duke of York's Royal Military School named one of their houses after him.
- Several military barracks are named after him, such as Alanbrooke Barracks in Paderborn Garrison, Germany, and Alanbrooke Barracks in Topcliffe, North Yorkshire.
- A statue of Alanbrooke by Ivor Roberts-Jones was unveiled at Whitehall, London, in 1993.
- Allanbrooke Road in Sentosa, Singapore is named after him.

== In popular culture ==
Brooke was portrayed in the television drama Churchill and the Generals by Eric Porter and in the film Churchill by Danny Webb.

He is memorably described by the narrator in Anthony Powell's novel, The Military Philosophers (the 9th volume in his roman-fleuve, A Dance to the Music of Time), who refers to:

...the hurricane-like imminence of a thickset general, obviously of high rank, wearing enormous horn-rimmed spectacles. He had just burst from a flagged staff-car almost before it had drawn up by the kerb. Now he tore up the steps of the building at the charge, exploding through the inner door into the hall. An extraordinary current of physical energy, almost of electricity, suddenly pervaded the place. I could feel it stabbing through me. This was the CIGS.

== Bibliography ==
- Alanbrooke, Field Marshal Lord (2001). Danchev, Alex; Todman, Daniel (eds.). War Diaries 1939–1945. Phoenix Press. ISBN 1-84212-526-5.
- Bidwell, Shelford (1973). The Royal Horse Artillery. Leo Cooper. ISBN 978-0850521382.
- Brooke, Alan (1940). Operations of the British Expeditionary Force, France from 12th June to 19th June 1940. Alanbrooke's Official Despatch published in "No. 37573". The London Gazette (Supplement). 21 May 1946. pp. 2433–2439.
- Bryant, Arthur. (1957) The turn of the tide; a history of the war years based on the diaries of Field-Marshal Lord Alanbrooke, chief of the Imperial General Staff via archive.org; Triumph in the west; a history of the war years based on the diaries of Field-Marshal Lord Alanbrooke, chief of the Imperial General Staff (1959) online free to borrow
- A, Danchev and D. Todman. "The Alanbrooke Diaries." Archives-London-British Records Association 27 (2002): 57–74.
- Caddick-Adams, Peter (2012). Monty and Rommel: Parallel Lives. Arrow. ISBN 9781848091542.
- Dear, I. C. B.; Foot, M. R. D., eds. (2005) [1995]. The Oxford Companion to World War II. Oxford: Oxford University Press. ISBN 0-19-280666-1.
- Doherty, Richard (2004). Ireland's Generals in the Second World War. Four Courts Press. ISBN 9781851828654.
- Fraser, David (1982). Alanbrooke. Atheneum New York. ISBN 0-689-11267-X. via archive.org
- Galloway, Peter (2006). The Order of the Bath.
- Hastings, Max (2005). Armageddon. The battle for Germany 1944–45. Pan Macmillan. ISBN 0-330-49062-1.
- Hastings, Max (2009). Finest years, Churchill as Warlord 1940–45. Harper Press. ISBN 978-0-00-726367-7.
- Heathcote, Tony (1999). The British Field Marshals 1736–1997. Pen & Sword Books Ltd. ISBN 0-85052-696-5.
- Horrocks, Julian (2023). Alanbrooke The Reluctant Warrior. Troubador Publishing. ISBN 978-1803135847.
- Hart, B. H. Liddell. "Western War Strategy: A Critical Analysis of the Alanbrooke Diaries." Royal United Services Institution. Journal vol 105 #617 (1960): 52–61.
- Mead, Richard (2007). Churchill's Lions: A biographical guide to the key British generals of World War II. Stroud (UK): Spellmount. ISBN 978-1-86227-431-0.
- Reynolds, David (2005). In Command of History, Churchill Fighting and Writing the Second World War. Penguin Books. ISBN 0-14-101964-6.
- Roberts, Andrew (2004). Hitler and Churchill: Secrets of Leadership. Phoenix. ISBN 0-7538-1778-0.
- Roberts, Andrew (2009). Masters and Commanders. How Roosevelt, Churchill, Marshall and Alanbrooke won the war in the west. Allen Lane. ISBN 978-0-7139-9969-3. (pb 2009) Online via archive.org
- Sangster, Andrew (2021). Alan Brooke - Churchill's Right-Hand Critic: A Reappraisal of Lord Alanbrooke. Casemate. ISBN 978-1612009681.
- Smart, Nick (2005). Biographical Dictionary of British Generals of the Second World War. Barnesley: Pen & Sword. ISBN 1844150496.
- Smith, Greg. "British Strategic Culture And General Sir Alan Brooke During World War II" Canadian Military Journal (2017) 1: 32–44. Online version

Military offices
Preceded by Clement Armitage	Commandant of the School of Artillery, Larkhill; 1929−1932	Succeeded by James Harrison
New title	GOC Mobile Division; 1937–1938	Succeeded by Roger Evans
New title	GOC-in-C Anti-Aircraft Command; April – July 1939	Succeeded by Sir Frederick Pile
Preceded by Sir Archibald Wavell	GOC-in-C Southern Command; July – August 1939	Succeeded by Sir Bertie Fisher
Preceded by Sir Archibald Wavell	GOC II Corps; 1939–1940	Succeeded by Bernard Montgomery
Preceded by Sir Bertie Fisher	GOC-in-C Southern Command; June – July 1940	Succeeded by Sir Claude Auchinleck
Preceded by Sir Edmund Ironside	C-in-C Home Forces; 1940–1941	Succeeded by Sir Bernard Paget
Preceded by Sir John Dill	Chief of the Imperial General Staff; 1941–1946	Succeeded by The Viscount Montgomery of Alamein
Honorary titles
Preceded by The Lord Milne	Master Gunner, St. James's Park; 1946–1956	Succeeded by Sir Cameron Nicholson
Preceded by Viscount Gort	Colonel commandant and president, Honourable Artillery Company; 1946–1954	Succeeded by Sir Julian Gascoigne
Preceded by The Earl Wavell	Constable of the Tower of London; 1950–1955	Succeeded by The Lord Wilson
Preceded by The Earl Wavell	Lord Lieutenant of the County of London; 1950–1956	Succeeded by The Earl Alexander of Tunis
Academic offices
Preceded by The Marquess of Londonderry	Chancellor of Queen's University of Belfast; 1949–1963	Succeeded by Sir Tyrone Guthrie
Peerage of the United Kingdom
New creation	Viscount Alanbrooke; 1946–1963	Succeeded by Thomas Brooke
New creation	Baron Alanbrooke; 1945–1963	Succeeded by Thomas Brooke
