= Bertie Fisher =

British Army general (1878–1972)

Lieutenant-general Sir Bertie Fisher KCB CMG DSO
- Born: 13 July 1878
- Died: 24 July 1972 (aged 94)
- Military career
- Allegiance: United Kingdom
- Branch: British Army
- Service years: 1900–1938; 1939–1940
- Rank: Lieutenant-general
- Service number: 6400
- Unit: 17th Lancers
- Commands: Southern Command (1939–1940); Royal Military College, Sandhurst (1934–1938); Senior Officers' School (1927–1930); 2nd Cavalry Brigade (1923–1927); 17th/21st Lancers (1922–1923); 8th Infantry Brigade (1918–1919); Leicestershire Yeomanry (1915)
- Conflicts: Second Boer War; First World War; Second World War
- Awards: Knight Commander of the Order of the Bath; Companion of the Order of St Michael and St George; Distinguished Service Order

Lieutenant-general Sir Bertie Drew Burdett Fisher, KCB, CMG, DSO (13 July 1878 – 24 July 1972) was a British Army general during the Second World War.

== Military career ==
Fisher was commissioned into the 17th Lancers as second lieutenant on 23 May 1900, and served in the Second Boer War, during which he was promoted to lieutenant on 29 July 1901. Following the end of the war, he returned from Cape Town to England in the SS Maplemore in August 1902.

Fisher went to the Staff College in 1911. In 1913 he learned to fly, and became a general staff officer in the Military Aeronautics Department at the War Office. He served in the First World War, initially as a brigade major in the 6th Cavalry Brigade, which formed part of the British Expeditionary Force, and then, after serving as commander of the Leicestershire Yeomanry in 1915, as general staff officer, grade 1 (GSO1), essentially chief of staff, of the 1st Cavalry Division, holding this post from August 1915 until January 1918. He was promoted to the temporary rank of lieutenant colonel while holding his appointment. He was then appointed commander of the 8th Infantry Brigade on 12 April 1918 and was granted the temporary rank of brigadier general while employed in this role, taking over as general officer commanding (GOC) from Llewelyn Price-Davies.

After the war, Fisher was the commander of the 17th Lancers at the time of their amalgamation with the 21st Lancers in 1922. He took command of the 2nd Cavalry Brigade in 1923 and was the commandant of the Senior Officer School in 1927. He was then a brigadier on the general staff at Aldershot Command from 1930 and Director Recruiting and Organisation at the War Office from 1932. He became commandant of the Royal Military College, Sandhurst, in 1934. He relinquished this appointment on 12 January 1938 and was then placed on half-pay and retired soon after. He had been promoted to lieutenant general in June 1931. On 25 February 1938 he succeeded General The Hon. Sir Herbert Lawrence as colonel of the 17th/21st Lancers.

Fisher was recalled from retirement during the Second World War to be general officer commanding-in-chief for Southern Command from 1939 to 1940, when he retired again. He lived in Basingstoke in Hampshire.

== Family ==
Fisher married Majorie Frances Boyd; they had two sons.

== Bibliography ==
- Davies, Frank (1997). Bloody Red Tabs: General Officer Casualties of the Great War 1914–1918. London: Pen & Sword Books. ISBN 978-0-85052-463-5.
- Smart, Nick (2005). Biographical Dictionary of British Generals of the Second World War. Barnsley, South Yorkshire: Pen and Sword Books. ISBN 1844150496.

Military offices
| Preceded by Reginald May | Commandant of the Royal Military College Sandhurst; 1934–1937 | Succeeded by Ralph Eastwood |
| Preceded by Sir Alan Brooke | GOC-in-C Southern Command; 1939–1940 | Succeeded by Sir Alan Brooke |
