= Thomas Brooke, 2nd Viscount Alanbrooke =

British hereditary peer (1920-1972)

Thomas Brooke, 2nd Viscount Alanbrooke (9 January 1920 – 19 December 1972), was a British hereditary peer.

== Early life and education ==
From an Ulster Anglo-Irish aristocratic family, Brooke was the elder son of Field Marshal Alan Brooke, 1st Viscount Alanbrooke and his first wife Jane Richardson.

Brooke was educated at Wellington College in Berkshire and fought in the Second World War in the Royal Artillery. He succeeded to the viscountcy and the subsidiary title Baron Alanbrooke on the death of his father in 1963.

== Career ==
Brooke was a writer and a watercolour artist.

== Family ==
Brooke was unmarried. He died in 1972 at the age of 52 and was succeeded in the viscountcy and barony by his younger half-brother, Victor Brooke, 3rd Viscount Alanbrooke. On the 3rd Viscount's death in 2018, the titles became extinct.

Peerage of the United Kingdom
Preceded by Alan Francis Brooke	Viscount Alanbrooke; 1963–1972	Succeeded by Alan Victor Harold Brooke
