= Statue of Viscount Alanbrooke, London =

Statue in Whitehall, London, England

Statue of Viscount Alanbrooke
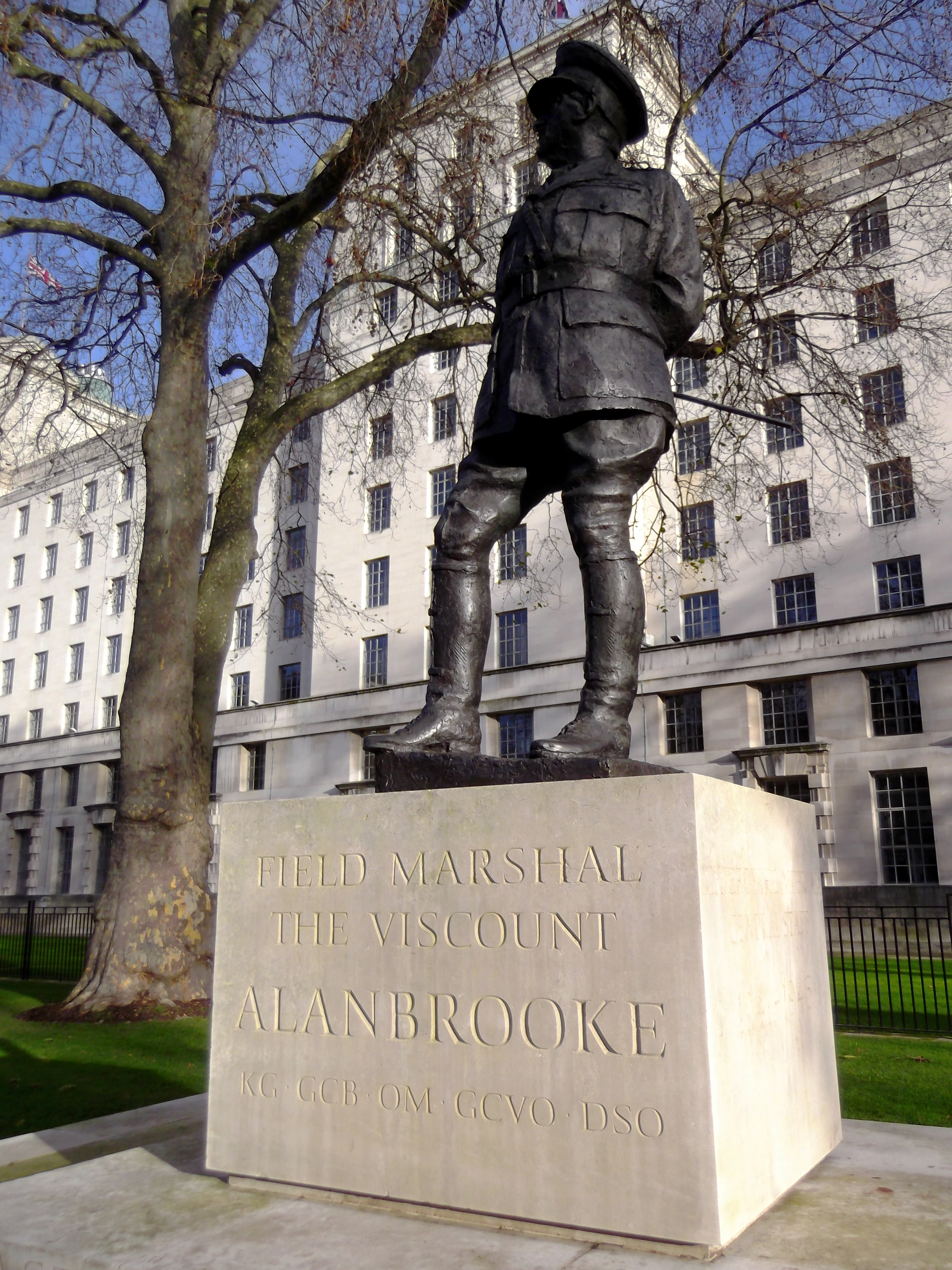
- The statue of Lord Alanbrooke in 2012
- Location: London, England; 51°30′13″N 0°07′33″W

The statue of Field Marshal Alan Brooke, 1st Viscount Alanbrooke, by Ivor Roberts-Jones, was unveiled in Whitehall, London, in 1993.
