= Denis Pelli =

American psychologist (born 1954)

Denis Guillermo Pelli
- Born: 1954 (age 71–72)
- Education: Harvard University
- Known for: Equivalent input noise Psychtoolbox; QUEST
- Scientific career
- Fields: Psychology; Neuroscience
- Workplaces: New York University
- Doctoral advisor: Fergus W. Campbell

Denis Pelli (born 1954) is a professor of psychology and neural science at New York University studying object recognition and reading. Pelli studied applied math at Harvard, and completed his PhD in physiology at Cambridge with Campbell and Robson in 1981. Since 1995, he is Professor of Psychology and Neural Science at New York University. Pelli is known for his contributions to the fields of visual sensitivity, letter identification, object recognition, the Psychtoolbox, equivalent input noise, QUEST, the Pelli–Zhang video attenuator, and the Pelli–Robson Contrast Sensitivity Chart, which allows for clinical measurement of contrast sensitivity. Current research in Pelli's lab covers object recognition and visual crowding, as well as the experience of beauty. Pelli serves as an associate editor for the Journal of Vision, and has published over 50 publications.
