= Pelli =

Pelli is the surname of:

- Arttu Pelli (born 1996), Finnish ice hockey
- César Pelli (1926–2019), Argentine architect
- Denis Pelli (born 1954), Professor of Psychology and Neural Science at New York University
- Fulvio Pelli (born 1951), Swiss politician
- Giuseppe Bencivenni Pelli (1729−1808), Italian civil servant and essayist
- Jussi Pelli (born 1954), Finnish modern pentathlete and fencer
- Leemour Pelli (born 1964), American artist

== See also ==
- Pelly (surname)
