= Psychtoolbox for MATLAB =

Software functions

Psychophysics Toolbox Version 3 (PTB-3) is a collection of free functions for MATLAB or GNU Octave intended for use by neuroscience and vision researchers. It synthesizes and shows accurately controlled visual and auditory stimuli and interacts with the observer. It has at least twelve thousand active users, an active forum, and many citations. PTB-3 is based on the Psychophysics Toolbox Version 2 (PTB-2) but its MATLAB extensions (in C) were rewritten to be more modular and use OpenGL. Psychtoolbox is offered alongside many alternative toolboxes for programming Psychophysics and Psychology experiments, such as PsychoPy for Python or jsPsych for JavaScript.

Psychophysics Toolbox Version 3 is free software. Most of it is released under the MIT License, but parts of it are licensed under other open source and free software licenses.
