= Pelly Island =

Island in the Northwest Territories, Canada

- Location within Northwest Territories
- Location: Northwest Territories, Canada
- Nearest city: Tuktoyaktuk
- Coordinates: 69.60°N 135.5°W

Pelly Island is an uninhabited island in the Beaufort Sea. It is named for Sir John Pelly, 1st Baronet, the 17th Governor of the Hudson's Bay Company.
