= Victor Brooke, 3rd Viscount Alanbrooke =

British peer (1932–2018)

Alan Victor Harold Brooke, 3rd Viscount Alanbrooke (24 November 1932 – 10 January 2018), was a British hereditary peer.

== Early life and education ==
Known to his family and friends as Victor, Lord Alanbrooke was the younger son of Field Marshal Alan Brooke, 1st Viscount Alanbrooke and his second wife, Benita Pelly.

He was educated at Harrow and the Royal Military Academy Sandhurst, from where he was commissioned into the Royal Artillery in 1952.

== Career ==
Alanbrooke gave up his British Army career in 1972, having risen only to the rank of captain. On 19 December 1972, upon the death of his elder half-brother Thomas Brooke, 2nd Viscount Alanbrooke, he succeeded to the viscountcy and to a seat in the House of Lords. In 1973, he went up to Bristol University and, in 1976, graduated as a Bachelor of Education (BEd) and earned Qualified Teacher Status.

== Interests ==
In his recreations in Debrett's, Alanbrooke listed "enjoying post-Lloyd's poverty, rearranging the wreckage for remaining family." He was a keen walker and spent most summers hiking the Cornish Coastal Path, alternating each time between a clockwise or anti-clockwise route to ensure, he said, "That my face rusts evenly on both sides".

== Death ==
Lord Alanbrooke lived in Hartley Wintney, Hampshire, where his father is buried. He died on 10 January 2018 at the age of 85 and his funeral took place at St Eligius Church, Arborfield. He was unmarried. As there were no further male line heirs of the 1st Viscount, the viscountcy and the subsidiary title of Baron Alanbrooke became extinct upon his death.

Peerage of the United Kingdom
Preceded by Thomas Brooke	Viscount Alanbrooke; 1972–2018	Extinct
