= John Pelly =

English businessman

Sir John Henry Pelly Bt DL
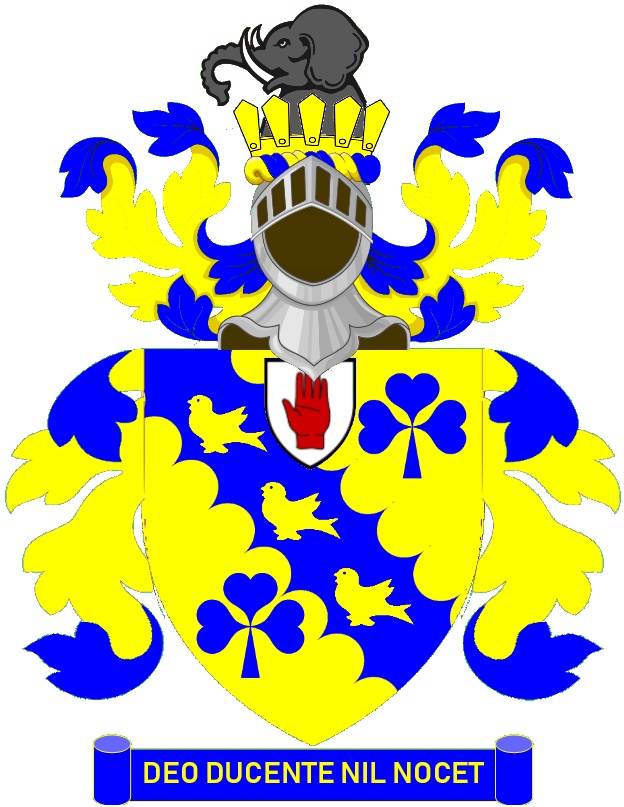

17th Governor of the Hudson's Bay Company
- In office 1822–1852

Governor of the Bank of England
- In office 1841–1842
- Preceded by: Sir John Rae Reid
- Succeeded by: William Cotton

Personal details
- Born: John Henry Pelly; 31 March 1777 England
- Died: 13 August 1852 (aged 75) West Ham, Essex, England
- Citizenship: British
- Spouse: Emma (nee Boulton)
- Children: 10
- Known for: Governor, Hudson's Bay Company; Governor of the Bank of England

Sir John Henry Pelly, 1st Baronet, DL (31 March 1777 – 13 August 1852) was an English businessman. During most of his career, he was an employee of the Hudson's Bay Company (HBC), serving as Governor of the HBC for three decades. He held other noteworthy offices, including Governor of the Bank of England. The title of Baronet Pelly was created for him.

== Early years ==
Pelly was born on 31 March 1777. His father was Captain Henry Hinde Pelly (1744–1818), Esq., of Upton who worked for the East India Company, as did his father. Sally-Hitchen Blake (died 1824) was his mother.

Pelly was a fourth generation sailor, and possibly served in the Royal Navy at a young age.

== Career ==
Pelly became an Elder Brother of Trinity House in 1823, and Deputy Master some years later. He was a Commissioner of the Lord Lieutenant of the City of London, and of the Loan Office of Public Works and Fisheries. He served as magistrate and was appointed a Deputy Lieutenant of Essex on 16 October 1810. In 1835 he was elected a Fellow of the Royal Society.

From 1841–1842, he was Governor of the Bank of England. He was appointed a vice-president of the Marine Society in 1847. Pelly was also a businessman. He owned timber plantations in Norway. With Charles Boulton, and his father-in-law, Henry Boulton, Pelly was a partner in the company, Norway Merchants.

With Jukes Coulson and Paul Malin, Pelly was a partner in the ironmonger and iron merchants company, Jukes Coulson & Co.

=== Hudson's Bay Company ===
Pelly was a Director of the HBC before becoming its 17th Governor, serving in that capacity for three decades, from 1822 through 1852. Pelly was responsible for organizing several exploration parties, including some for Peter Warren Dease and Thomas Simpson which assisted in the discovery of the Northwest Passage. He was responsible for the 1849 colonization of Vancouver Island.

Pelly developed a business relationship with Sir George Simpson, Governor-in-Chief of Rupert's Land, and an HBC employee. They were partners in the London firm, Pelly, Simpson & Co., and the Norwegian firm, Pelly & Co.

== Personal life ==
He married Emma Boulton (1786–1856) of Leatherhead, Surrey in 1807. She was the daughter of Henry Boulton of Thorncroft, governor of the Corporation of Working Mines and Metals in Scotland. They had ten children. His eight sons were: Sir John Henry (who succeeded as baronet), Raymond, Charles, Albert, Richard-Wilson, Edmund, Octavius, and Percy-Leonard. His two daughters were Juliana-Sally and Emma-Eugenia.

Sir Lewis Pelly, Conservative Member of Parliament and an East India Company officer, was his nephew.

Upon the recommendation of Lord Melbourne, he was created Baronet Pelly, of Upton in the county of Essex in the Baronetage of the United Kingdom on 6 July 1840.

He had residences at Warnham Court near Horsham, Sussex, and Upton House, West Ham, Essex. Pelly died at his home, Upton House, in 1852.

His four-times great granddaughter is the Labour Party Member of Parliament for Aylesbury Laura Kyrke-Smith.

== Honours ==
Several landforms were named in his honour. In the Northwest Territories, these included Pelly Island and Pelly Lake. In Nunavut, there is Mount Pelly, Pelly Bay, and Pelly Point. In Saskatchewan, the HBC post, Fort Pelly bears his name, as well as the unincorporated town of Pelly. In the Yukon, Pelly Banks, Pelly Crossing, Pelly Formation, Pelly Lakes, Pelly Mountains, and the Pelly River bear his name.

Coat of arms of John Pelly

Crest
Out of a crown vallary an elephant's head.
Escutcheon
Or on a bend engrailed Azure between two trefoils three martlets.
Motto
Deo Ducente Nil Nocet (God Guiding, Nothing Hurts)

Government offices
| Preceded by Sir John Rae Reid | Governor of the Bank of England; 1841–1842 | Succeeded by William Cotton |
Baronetage of the United Kingdom
| New creation | Baronet (of Upton); 1840–1852 | Succeeded by John Henry Pelly |
