= Kpelle =

Kpelle may refer to:

- Kpelle people
- Kpelle language
- Kpelle syllabary
