= Henry Joseph Pelly =

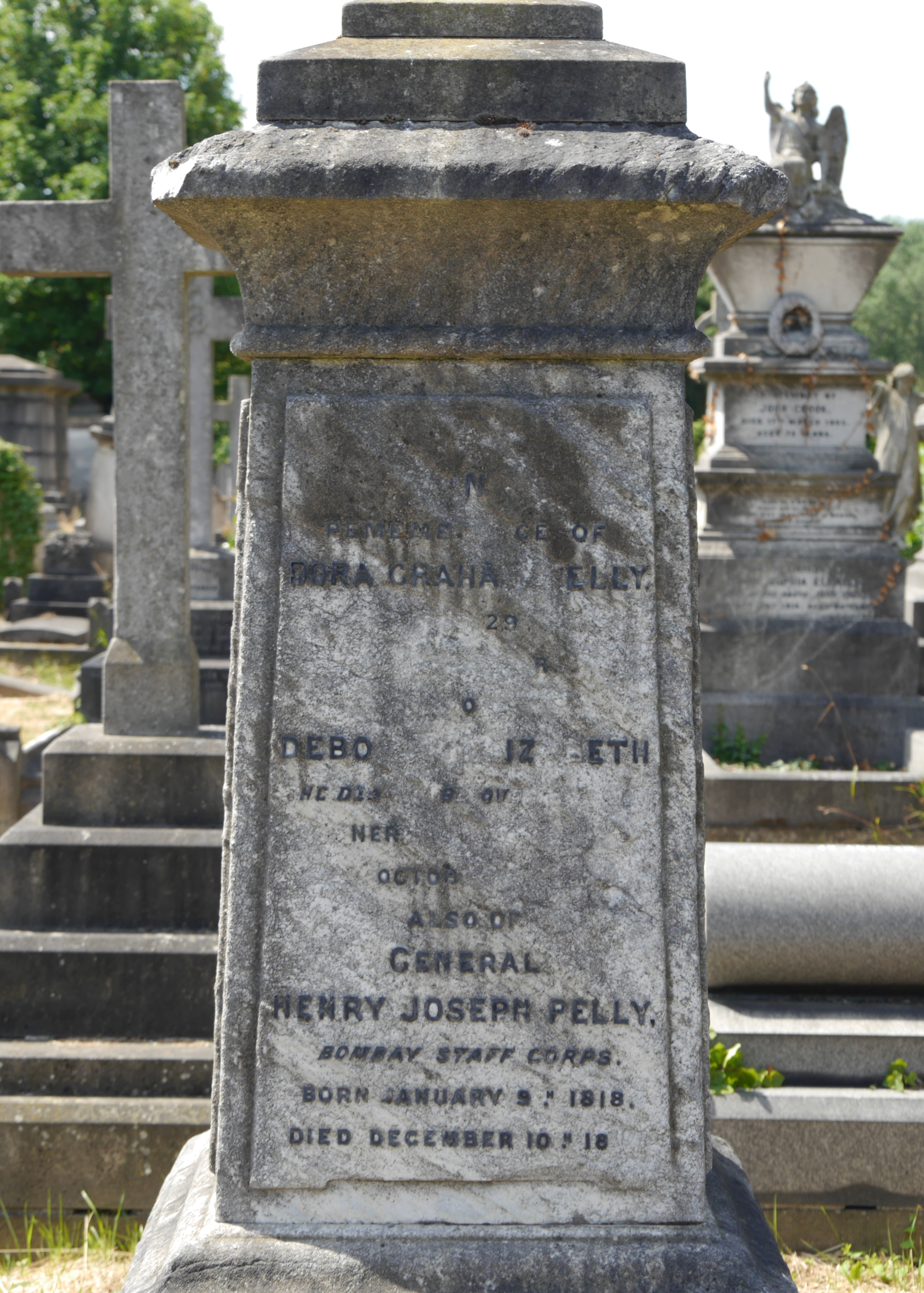
Monument, Kensal Green Cemetery

General Henry Joseph Pelly (9 January 1818 - 10 December 1891) was a British Army officer and a general in the Indian Army's Bombay Staff Corps.

== Biography ==
Henry Joseph Pelly was born on 9 January 1818, the son of John Hinde Pelly and Elizabeth Lewis. He was promoted to general on 1 October 1877.

He was buried at Kensal Green Cemetery.
