= Le Pelley =

le Pelley is a surname, and may refer to:

- Daniel le Pelley (died 1752), Seigneur of Sark
- Ernest le Pelley (1801–1849), Seigneur of Sark
- Georges René Le Peley de Pléville (1726–1805), French admiral
- Mike E Le Pelley, researcher
- Nicolas le Pelley (1692–1742), Seigneur of Sark
- Pierre Carey le Pelley (19th century), Seigneur of Sark
- Pierre Dumanoir le Pelley (1770–1829), French Navy officer
- Pierre le Pelley I (1736–1778), Seigneur of Sark
- Pierre le Pelley II (18th century), Seigneur of Sark
- Pierre le Pelley III (died 1839), Seigneur of Sark
- Susanne le Pelley (1668–1733), Dame of Sark

== See also ==
- Pelley
