= 1742 =

1742 in various calendars
- Gregorian calendar: 1742; MDCCXLII
- Ab urbe condita: 2495
- Armenian calendar: 1191; ԹՎ ՌՃՂԱ
- Assyrian calendar: 6492
- Balinese saka calendar: 1663–1664
- Bengali calendar: 1148–1149
- Berber calendar: 2692
- British Regnal year: 15 Geo. 2 – 16 Geo. 2
- Buddhist calendar: 2286
- Burmese calendar: 1104
- Byzantine calendar: 7250–7251
- Chinese calendar: 辛酉年 (Metal Rooster); 4439 or 4232 — to — 壬戌年 (Water Dog); 4440 or 4233
- Coptic calendar: 1458–1459
- Discordian calendar: 2908
- Ethiopian calendar: 1734–1735
- Hebrew calendar: 5502–5503
- Hindu calendars
- Vikram Samvat: 1798–1799
- Shaka Samvat: 1663–1664
- Kali Yuga: 4842–4843
- Holocene calendar: 11742
- Igbo calendar: 742–743
- Iranian calendar: 1120–1121
- Islamic calendar: 1154–1155
- Japanese calendar: Kanpō 2 (寛保２年)
- Javanese calendar: 1666–1667
- Julian calendar: Gregorian minus 11 days
- Korean calendar: 4075
- Minguo calendar: 170 before ROC 民前170年
- Nanakshahi calendar: 274
- Thai solar calendar: 2284–2285
- Tibetan calendar: ལྕགས་མོ་བྱ་ལོ་ (female Iron-Bird); 1868 or 1487 or 715 — to — ཆུ་ཕོ་ཁྱི་ལོ་ (male Water-Dog); 1869 or 1488 or 716

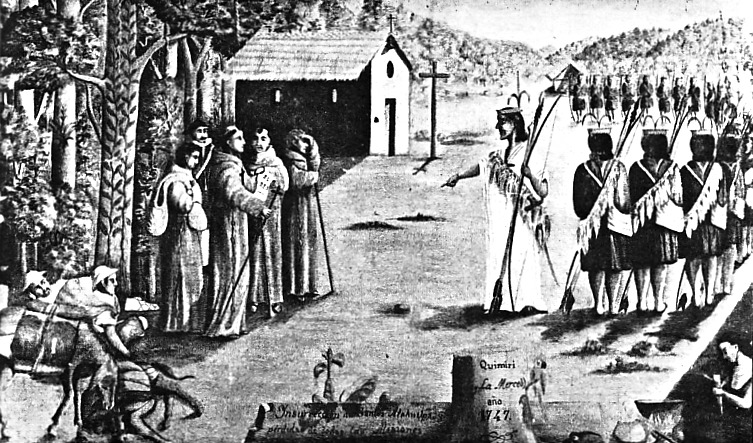
May: Juan Santos Atahualpa leads an uprising against the Spanish colonial government in Peru as Atahualpa II.

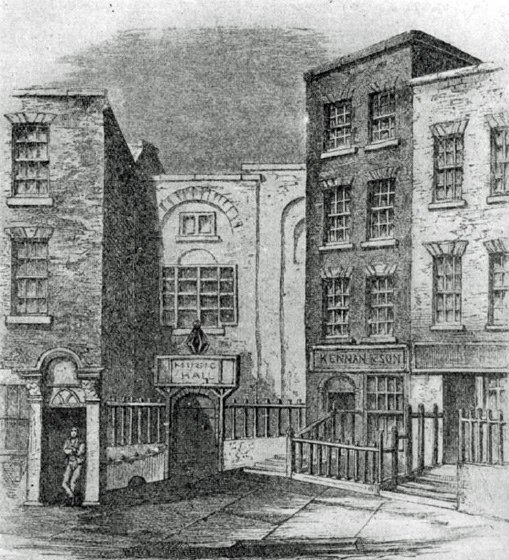
April 13:Handel's Messiah is performed for the first time.

1742 (MDCCXLII) was a common year starting on Monday of the Gregorian calendar and a common year starting on Friday of the Julian calendar, the 1742nd year of the Common Era (CE) and Anno Domini (AD) designations, the 742nd year of the 2nd millennium, the 42nd year of the 18th century, and the 3rd year of the 1740s decade. As of the start of 1742, the Gregorian calendar was 11 days ahead of the Julian calendar, which remained in localized use until 1923.

== Events ==
=== January–March ===
- January 9 – Robert Walpole is made Earl of Orford, and resigns as First Lord of the Treasury and Chancellor of the Exchequer, effectively ending his period as Prime Minister of Great Britain. On his formally relinquishing office five days later, he will have served 20 years and 314 days as Prime Minister, the longest single term ever, and also longer than the accumulated terms of any other British Prime Minister.
- January 14 – Edmond Halley dies; James Bradley succeeds him as Astronomer Royal of Great Britain.
- January 24 – Charles VII becomes Holy Roman Emperor.
- January 28? – The House of Commons of Great Britain votes on the alleged rigging of the Chippenham by-election. It becomes a motion of no confidence, which leads to the resignation of Robert Walpole.
- February 12 – John Carteret, 2nd Lord Carteret becomes Secretary of State for the Northern Department in Great Britain.
- February 15— First Silesian War, part of War of the Austrian Succession: Troops of the Kingdom of Prussia, Saxony and France, under the command of Prince Dietrich of Anhalt-Dessau, capture the Moravian town of Iglau (now Jihlava). At this point, the Saxons and French declare that their obligations to Prussia have ceased.
- February 16 – Spencer Compton, Earl of Wilmington, becomes Prime Minister of Great Britain.
- February 22 – Henry Fielding publishes his picaresque novel Joseph Andrews anonymously in London when "the first edition... reached the bookstalls" in the city.
- March 15
  - Denmark-Norway concludes a treaty of friendship with France, a day after the expiration of its 1739 treaty with Great Britain.
  - The Verendrye brothers take possession of South Dakota in the name of the King of France.
- March 29 – Acting in his capacity of Grand Duke of Lithuania, Poland's King Stanisław August Poniatowski issues a proclamation allowing Jews in the Lithuanian capital of Vilnius to live anywhere except for two public streets, the Pilies street and the Galves Street.

=== April –June ===
- April 13 – George Frideric Handel's oratorio The Messiah is first performed, in Dublin, Ireland in aid of local charities.
- May 17 – Battle of Chotusitz: Frederick the Great's army defeats the Austrians.
- May 24 – War of the Austrian Succession – Battle of Sahay: French forces defeat the Austrians.
- May – In Peru, Juan Santos takes the name Atahualpa II, and begins an ill-fated rebellion against Spanish rule. Father Domingo Garcia sends the first report of the rebellion to his superiors on June 2.
- June 7 – Christian Goldbach first describes Goldbach's conjecture ("Every even number is the sum of two primes") in a letter to fellow mathematician Leonhard Euler.
- June 11 – Peace of Breslau: Austria cedes Silesia to Prussia.
- June 20 – İzmir, formerly the ancient Greek city of Smyrna, is destroyed by fire.

=== July–September ===
- July 7 – War of Jenkins' Ear: Battle of Bloody Marsh – British troops repel those of Spain (under Montiano), in the Province of Georgia.
- July 14 – William Pulteney is created 1st Earl of Bath in Great Britain.
- August 17
  - Accompanied by 10 French Army observers, Choctaw Indians from the French Louisiana territory cross the Tombigbee River and raid Chickasaw Indian towns in Georgia. Over three days, the attackers lose 50 men, the Chickasaw defenders about 25. For permitting the attack, the French Louisiana governor, the Sieur de Bienville, is summoned back to Paris.
  - Irish author and poet Dean Jonathan Swift is declared by a court to be "of unsound mind and memory" and confined to home treatment for the remaining three years of his life.
- August 19
  - A British fleet led by Commodore William Martin enters the harbor of Naples with three warships, two frigates, and four bomb vessels, and sends a message giving the King Charles VII of Naples (the future King Charles III of Spain) 30 minutes to agree to withdraw Neapolitan troops from the Spanish Army. Don Carlos agrees and ends the threat of a Spanish foothold in Italy.
  - Voltaire's controversial play Fanatacism, or Mahomet the Prophet is first performed, in Paris, to a theatre audience filled with French nobility.
- August 20 – The Swedish-Russian War effectively ends as 17,000 Swedish troops surrender in Finland at Helsingfors (Helsinki).
- August 27 – George Anson, captain of HMS Centurion, arrives with his seriously ill crew at the island of Tinian (now U.S. territory as one of the Northern Mariana Islands) and saves his mission.
- September 5 – The 46 survivors of Russia's Great Northern Expedition return to Petropavlovsk after having been shipwrecked on an island in the Bering Strait ten months earlier. They had completed the building of a new ship from the wreckage of the St Pyotr on August 21.
- September 16 – Construction starts on the Foundling Hospital in London.

=== October–December ===
- October 5
  - Pedro Cebrian y Agustin, Count of Fuenclara, arrives at Veracruz to become the new Spanish Viceroy of New Spain.
  - Pennsylvania's Colonial Governor George Thomas bars citizens from settling in Lancaster County, or west of the Blue Mountains.
- November 13 – The Royal Danish Academy of Sciences and Letters is founded.
- December 2 – The Pennsylvania Journal first appears in the United States.

=== Date unknown ===
- The Lopukhina Conspiracy arises at the Russian court.
- The Afghan tribes unite as a monarchy.
- Daniel le Pelley succeeds Nicolas le Pelley, as Seigneur of Sark.
- Molde, Norway, becomes a city.
- Eisenach, Germany builds its Stadtschloss (city castle).
- Spain completes the construction of Fort Matanzas in the Matanzas Inlet, approximately 15 miles (24 km) south of St. Augustine, Florida.
- The University of Erlangen is founded in Bavaria.
- Anders Celsius publishes his proposal for a centigrade temperature scale originated in 1741.
- Colin Maclaurin publishes his Treatise on Fluxions.
- Charles Jervas's English translation of Don Quixote is published posthumously. Through a printer's error, the translator's name is printed as 'Charles Jarvis', leading the book to forever be known as the Jarvis translation. It is acclaimed as the most faithful English rendering of the novel made up to this time.
- The Roman Catholic church decrees that Roman ceremonial practice in Latin (not in Chinese) is to be the law for Chinese missions.

== Births ==
- January 8 – Philip Astley, English circus organizer (d. 1814)
- March 9 – Michael Anckarsvärd, Swedish politician (d. 1838)
- March 10 – Sampson Salter Blowers, American lawyer, jurist (d. 1842)

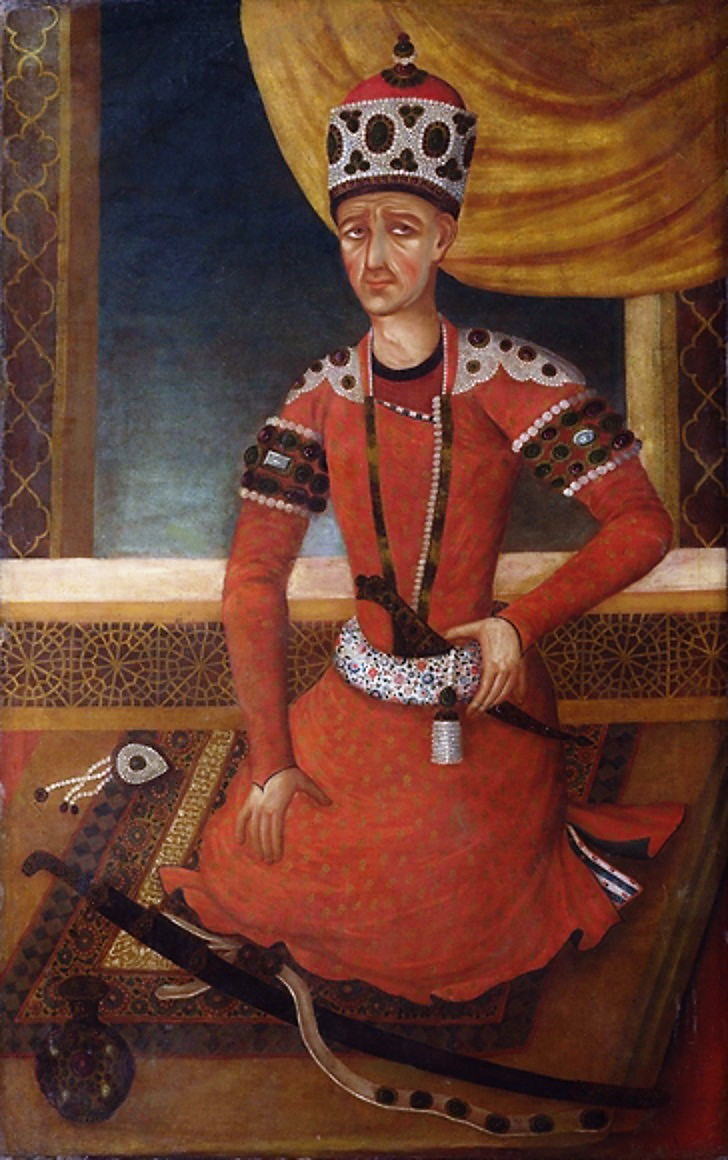
Agha Mohammad Khan Qajar

- March 14 – Agha Mohammad Khan Qajar, Iranian king (d. 1797)
- March 12 – Aletta Haniel, German business person (d. 1815)
- April 28 – Henry Dundas, British statesman (d. 1811)
- May 6 – Jean Senebier, Swiss pastor, botanist (d. 1809)
- June 25 – Johann Schweighäuser, German classical scholar (d. 1830)
- June 26 – Arthur Middleton, American politician (d. 1787)
- June 28 – William Hooper, American statesman (d. 1790)
- July 21 – John Cleves Symmes, American statesman (d. 1814)
- July 27 – Nathanael Greene, American general (d. 1786)
- August 14 – Pope Pius VII (b. Barnaba Niccolò Maria Luigi Chiaramonti), Italian Benedictine (d. 1823)

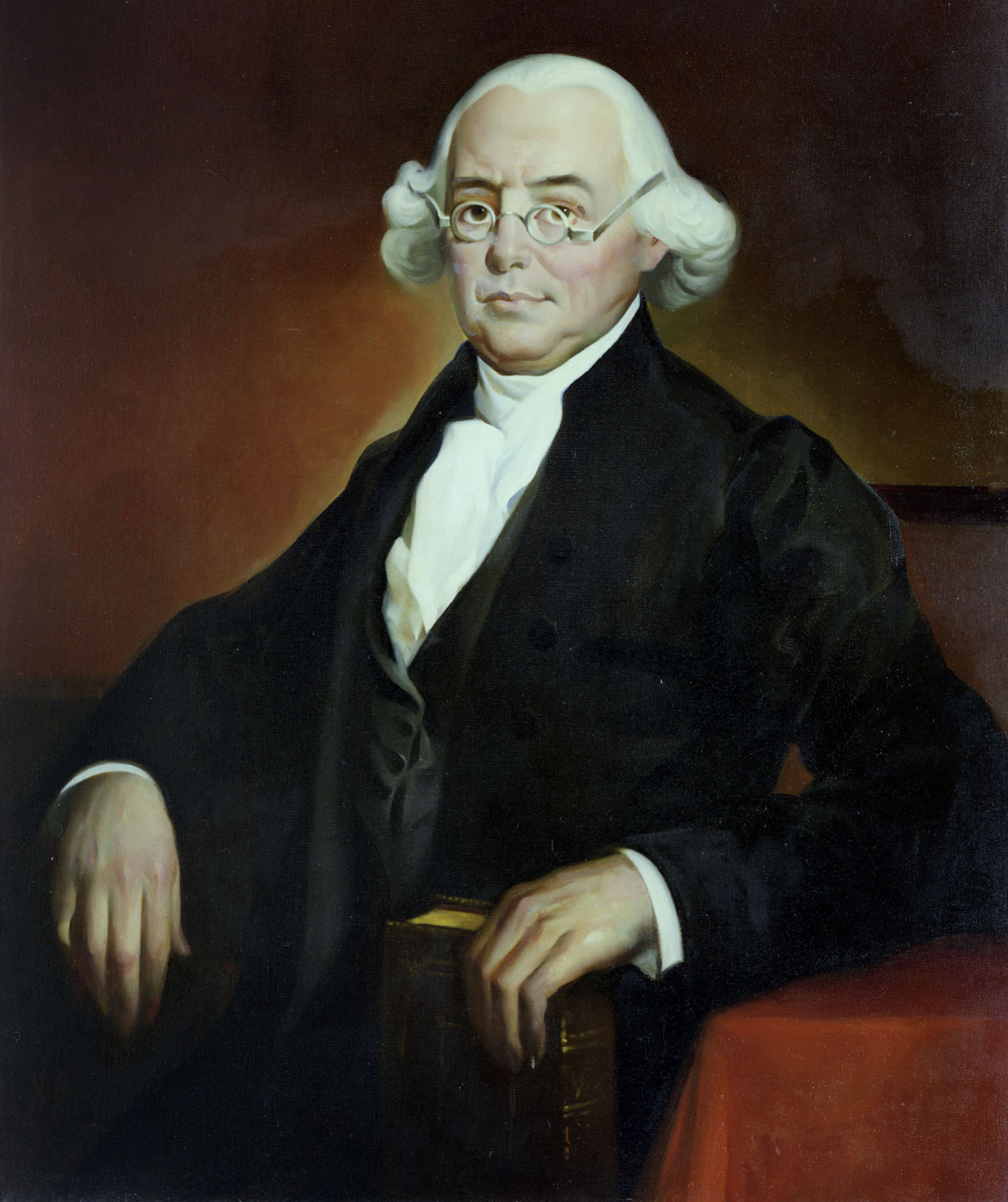
James Wilson

- September 14 – James Wilson, American politician, Associate Justice of the Supreme Court of the United States (d. 1798)
- October 3 – Anders Jahan Retzius, Swedish chemist, botanist (d. 1821)
- October 6 – Johan Herman Wessel, Norwegian poet (d. 1785)
- November 5 – Richard Cosway, English artist (d. 1821)

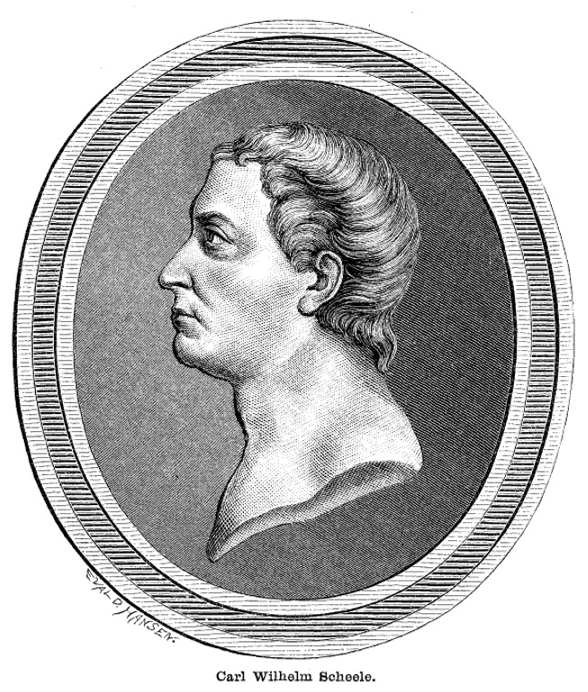
Carl Wilhelm Scheele

- December 9 – Carl Wilhelm Scheele, Swedish chemist (d. 1785)
- December 16 – Gebhard Leberecht von Blücher, Prussian general (d. 1819)
- December 26 (bapt.) – George Chalmers, Scottish antiquarian (d. 1825)
- date unknown – Túpac Amaru II, Peruvian indigenous rebel leader (d. 1781)
- date unknown – Rafaela Herrera, Nicaraguan heroine (d. 1805)
- date unknown – Francis Nash, American military officer (d. 1777)
- date unknown – Hendrik Frans de Cort, Flemish painter (d. 1810)

== Deaths ==
- January 1 – Peregrine Bertie, 2nd Duke of Ancaster and Kesteven, English statesman (b. 1686)

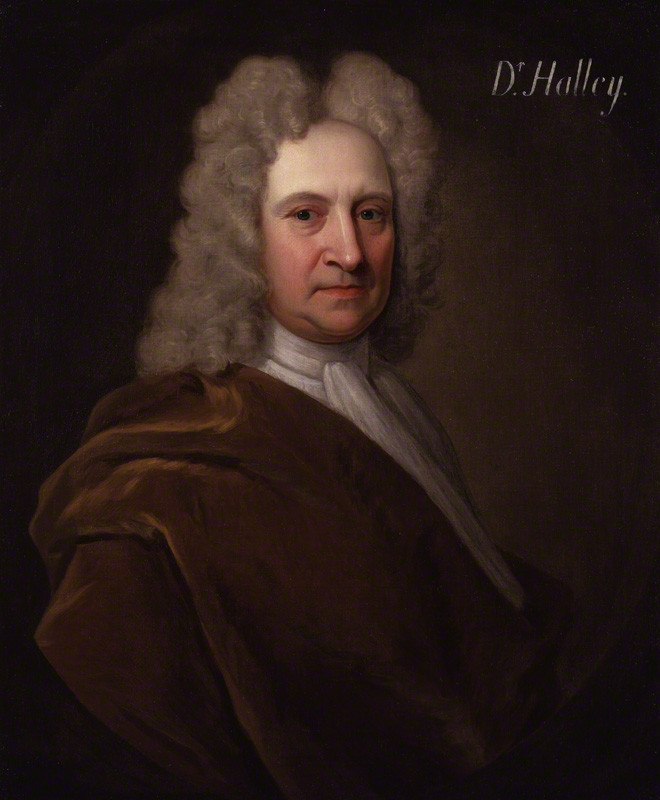
Edmond Halley

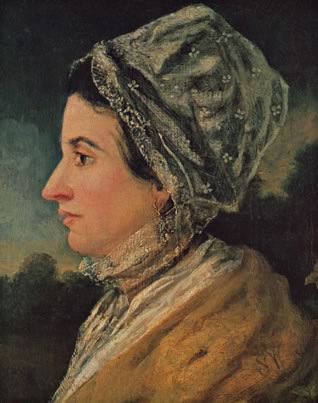
Susanna Wesley

- January 25 – Edmond Halley, English astronomer (b. 1656)
- February 22 – Charles Rivington, English publisher (b. 1688)
- March 16 – David-Henri de Meuron, Swiss Merchant (b. 1706)
- March 23 – Jean-Baptiste Dubos, French author (b. 1670)
- April 2 – James Douglas, Scottish physician, anatomist (b. 1675)
- April 15 – Samuel Shute, Governor of Massachusetts Bay and New Hampshire (b. 1662)
- April 17 – Arvid Horn, Swedish statesman (b. 1664)
- May 13 – Ludwig IX, Landgrave of Hesse-Darmstadt (b. 1719)
- May 21 – Lars Roberg, Swedish physician (b. 1664)
- May 26 – Pylyp Orlyk, Ukrainian Zaporozhian Cossack starshina, diplomat (b. 1672)
- June 18 – John Aislabie, British politician (b. 1670)
- June 20 – Charles Ewer, British politician.
- June 27 – Nathan Bailey, English philologist, lexicographer
- July 1 – Bohuslav Matěj Černohorský, Czech composer (b. 1684)
- July 2 – Robert Petre, 8th Baron Petre, British peer, renowned horticulturist (b. 1713)
- July 4 – Guido Grandi, Italian mathematician (b. 1671)
- July 9 – John Oldmixon, English historian (b. 1673)
- July 12 – Evaristo Abaco, Italian composer (b. 1675)
- July 14 – Richard Bentley, English scholar and critic (b. 1662)
- July 19 – William Somervile, English poet (b. 1675)
- July 23 – Susanna Wesley, mother of John and Charles Wesley, known as mother of Methodism. (b. 1669)
- July 30 – Nicholas Roosevelt (1658–1742), Dutch-American politician (b. 1658)
- August 14 – Maria van Lommen, Dutch gold- and silversmith and guild member (b. 1688)
- August 25 – Carlos Seixas, Portuguese composer (b. 1704)
- September 18 – Vincenzo Ludovico Gotti, Italian Catholic cardinal (b. 1664)
- September 22 – Frederic Louis Norden, Danish explorer (b. 1708)
- September 27 – Hugh Boulter, Irish Archbishop of Armagh (b. 1672)
- September 28 – Jean Baptiste Massillon, French bishop (b. 1663)
- November 12 – Friedrich Hoffmann, German physician, chemist (b. 1660)
- November 20 – Melchior de Polignac, French diplomat (b. 1661)
- November 24 – Andrew Bradford, American publisher (b. 1686)
- December 18 – William Fairfield, Massachusetts Speaker of the House of Deputies (b. 1662)
- December 31 – Karl III Philip, Elector Palatine (b. 1661)
