= The Window in the Rock =

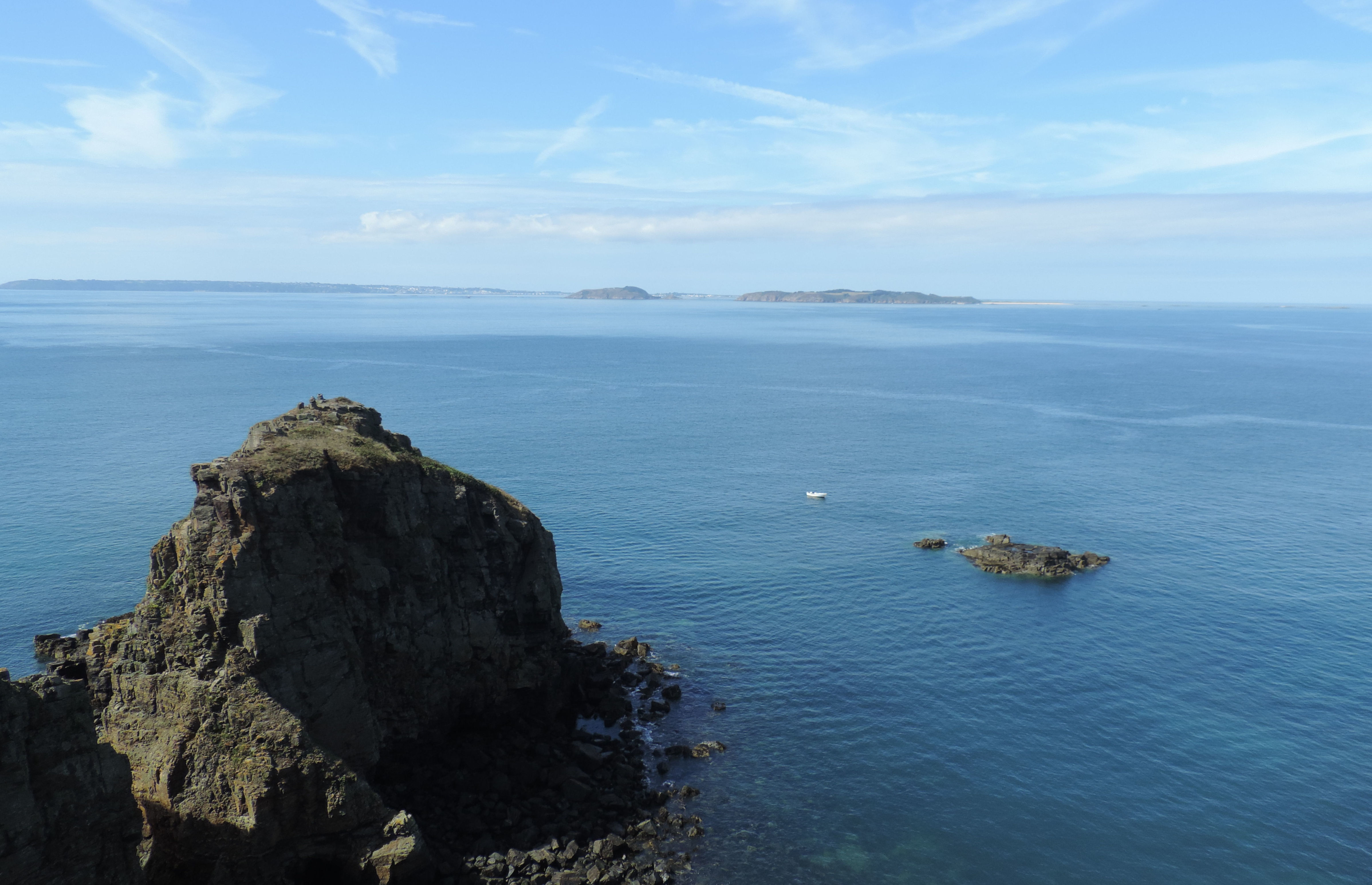
- The view from the Window in the Rock on Sark towards Herm and Guernsey
- Location: Sark, Guernsey
- Designer: William Thomas Collings
- Type: Scenic viewpoint
- Completion date: 1853
- Opening date: 1853
- Website: https://www.sark.co.uk/

The Window in the Rock is a man-made viewpoint and tourist attraction on Sark in the Channel Islands. It consists of a square aperture blasted through a limestone cliff face to frame a view of the coastline, as well as Herm, Jethou and Guernsey.

== History ==
The window was commissioned by the Rev. William Thomas Collings, who served as the Seigneur of Sark from 1853 until his death in 1882. Collings had the window created by blasting a hole in the cliff using explosives in 1853.

Collings intended for the window to serve as a scenic viewpoint for visitors. At the time Sark's tourism industry was beginning to grow and after the window became popular tourism began to increase, with 5000 annual visitors to the island by the 1870s. The window may also have been used for hauling goods or seaweed up from the beach.

Today the window remains a popular tourist attraction in Sark and one of the most famous viewpoints on the island. The window opens onto a sheer cliff with a drop of approximately 250 feet (76 m) to the shoreline below. There are no safety railings or barriers.

== See also ==
- Sark
- La Coupée
- William Thomas Collings
