= List of tenants of Jethou =

The following is a list of tenants of Jethou. Jethou is an island in the Channel Islands owned by the States of Guernsey. In 1416 AD, it became part of Henry V of England's estate, and remains a Crown lease.

== List of tenants ==
Date	Name	Notes	Ref
1028-1055	Restauld		
1055-1414	the Abbots of Mont Saint-Michel		
1158-?	Guillaume Chesney	Reverting to the Abbots of Mont Saint-Michel on his death.	
1270-?	Sir William de Chesney	Reverting to the Abbots of Mont Saint-Michel on his death.	
1414-?	Benedictine monks	According to Jethou guide book, "other Benedictine Monks occupied the Island for another 100 years".	
?–1717	uninhabited		
1717-1737	Charles Nowall		
1737-1758	Charles Mauger	Died 1758.	
1758-1779	Thomas Guille; Thomas Le Marchant		
1779-1781	Henry de Jersey	Died 1781.	
1781-1800	Henry de Jersey II		
1800-1821	Phillip de Quesnel		
1821-1822	Edward Falla; Peter Le Cocq; Nicholas Le Feuvre; Peter de Lisle		
1822-1846	John Allaire		
1846-1852	Marie Collings	Died 1853.	
1852-1856	the States of Guernsey	Island used for quarrying.	
1856-1863	George Charles Gee		
1863-1867	Perry; Lindell; Giffard		
1867-1877	Montague Fielden		
1877-1880	caretakers		
1880-1885	W.H.B. Moullin		
1885-1890	caretakers		
1890-1918-11-07	Sir Henry Austin Lee	Died 1918.	
1899-1910	F.J. Guy	Subtenant	
1919-1920	John Drillot	Caretaker	
1920-1934	Sir Edward Montague Compton Mackenzie		
1934-1944	Harold Fortington	Died 1944.	
1940-1945	George MacDonald	Subtenant	
1944-1948	Fortington		
1948-1955	William Gill Withycombe		
1955-1957	Philip Steer Watkins		
1957-1958	Herman Stockey		
1958-12-1964	William Hedley Cliff		
1964-09-29-1971-12-06	Susan Faed		
1971-12-1983-02-03	Sir Charles Hayward	Died 1983.	
1984-1991	Anthony Duckworth-Chad		
1991-1995	Peter Ogden; Philip Hulme		
1995-	The States of Guernsey		
1995-	:Subtenants :Sir Peter Ogden :Sir Philip Hulme		

== Bibliography ==
- Ben Cahoon. "Guernsey". World Statesmen.org. Archived from the original on 9 August 2007.
