= Marie Collings =

Guernsey heiress (1791–1853)

Dame of Sark
- In office 1852–1853
- Preceded by: Pierre Carey le Pelley
- Succeeded by: William Thomas Collings

Personal details
- Born: Marie Allaire; 1791
- Died: 1853 (aged 61–62)
- Spouse: Thomas Guérin Collings
- Children: William Thomas Collings
- Parent: John Allaire

Marie Collings (née Allaire; 1791–1853), sometimes referred to as Mary Collings, was a wealthy Guernsey heiress who ruled as Dame of Sark (island) from 1852 to 1853, being the island's second female ruler and the first holder of the fief from the presently ruling seigneurial family. She inherited the fortune of her father, the privateer John Allaire, who had obtained the mortgage on the fief shortly before his death. The island's then-ruling seigneur, Pierre Carey le Pelley, soon had no option but to sell the fief to Collings, but she never actively governed it.

== Background ==
Collings was born into a wealthy family from Guernsey, one of the Channel Islands. She was one of the two daughters of the privateer John Allaire (1762–1846), the other one being Catherine Allaire. Her father was reputedly the most affluent man in Guernsey, whose fortune appears to have stemmed not only from privateering during the Napoleonic Wars, but also from outright piracy. She was married to Thomas Guérin Collings, Constable of the Town and Parish of Saint Peter Port. The couple had a son, William Thomas Collings (1823–1882), and several daughters. Collings' husband died in 1832.

== Mortgage ==
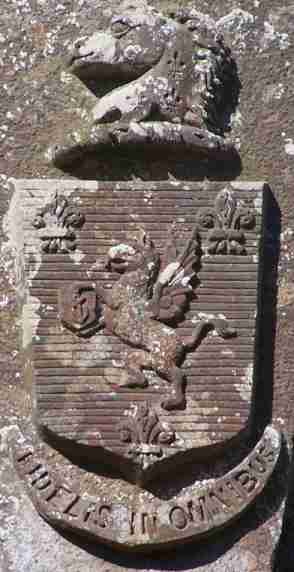
Collings family coat of arms at the gate of the Seigneurie

On 24 February 1844, desperate for funds to continue the operation of the silver mine on the island, the then-Seigneur of Sark Ernest le Pelley obtained crown permission to mortgage the fief of Sark for £4,000 to Collings' father. The latter died within two years, leaving his wealth to his daughters. The mortgage and the tenement of the island of Jethou passed to Collings. The mine closed in 1847, two years after the uninsured collapse of its deepest gallery, and when Ernest le Pelley died in 1849 his successor, Pierre Carey le Pelley, was unable to keep up his mortgage payments to Collings. She then decided to foreclose the mortgage, forcing him to seek Queen Victoria's permission to sell the seigneurie of Sark on 10 November 1852. The widowed Marie Collings bought it on 4 December for £6,000 less the sum borrowed and an accumulated interest of £616.13s, for a total of £1,383.

== Seigneurship ==
By the time she became Dame of Sark, she was already too old to actively participate in the government of the island. She never visited it during her tenure, "to the regret of the Sark people". La Seigneurie, official residence of the ruler of Sark, was modernised and extended during Collings' brief rule, just like it was in the 1730s, when another widow, Susanne le Pelley, bought the fief. Collings meanwhile resided in Guernsey, and was represented in Sark by her only son and heir apparent, the Anglican priest William Thomas Collings. He succeeded her as seigneur of Sark upon her death in 1853, less than a year after the purchase. She was also survived by a daughter, Catherine Ann Allaire Ozanne (1826–1879). The island remains in Collings' family through the children of William Thomas and Louisa Collings. Her descendant Christopher Beaumont is the current seigneur.

Preceded by Pierre Carey le Pelley	Dame of Sark; 1852–1853	Succeeded by William Thomas Collings
