= William Collings =

William Collings may refer to:

- William Collings (politician), member of the Legislative Assembly of Ontario
- William Thomas Collings, Church of England clergyman and seigneur of Sark
- William Frederick Collings, his son, seigneur of Sark
- Billy Collings, Scottish footballer
- Bill Collings, founder of Collings Guitars
