= Meuron family =

Swiss patrician family from Neuchâtel

The Meuron family is a Swiss patrician family originally from Saint-Sulpice in the Canton of Neuchâtel, who became burghers of Neuchâtel in 1598. The family has been active in local politics in the Val-de-Travers, craftsmanship, service to the Principality of Neuchâtel, foreign military service, commerce, cultural and artistic life, and notably in cotton printing (indiennage) and colonial plantations.

== Origins and early history ==
The genealogy of the Meuron family is well established from Claude Meuron, a free man (homme franc) living at the end of the 15th century. Initially simple artisans, the Meurons became involved in local life as governors of Saint-Sulpice before entering the service of the prince, particularly from the 18th century onwards. For economic reasons, the family left the Val-de-Travers in the 17th century.

The family comprises 12 branches, seven of which were ennobled between 1711 (Etienne Meuron) and 1789. The social ascension of the family began with the establishment of Etienne Meuron (1683-1748) in Neuchâtel, whose descendants entered the service of the City of Neuchâtel (councillors, members of the Quatre-Ministraux), the Principality of Neuchâtel (mayors, châtelains, three councillors of state appointed between 1709 and 1811), or the Church.

== Military service ==
=== The Meuron Regiment ===
Many members of the Meuron family engaged in foreign military service. Charles-Daniel de Meuron, who served France in the Hallwyl Regiment and later as an officer in the Swiss Guards, raised a military unit in 1781 for the Dutch East India Company, of which he was both proprietor and commanding colonel. Stationed between 1783 and 1788 in the Cape of Good Hope colony, the family regiment was subsequently commanded by his brother, Pierre-Frédéric de Meuron.

The regiment was transferred to the island of Ceylon (Sri Lanka), where it served as a control force for the Dutch colony and participated in expeditions against the Kingdom of Kandy. During this period, Pierre-Frédéric de Meuron received from Dutch governor Willem Jacob van de Graaff a vast estate south of Colombo which was transformed into a plantation.

In 1795, the regiment transferred to British service and was moved to Madras. It was involved in several military campaigns, the most important being the 1799 campaign against the Kingdom of Mysore, an ally of the French, which culminated in the capture and sack of the capital Srirangapatna. The Meuron Regiment was finally deployed in the Mediterranean (1807-1813), then in the British colonies of Canada (1813-1816). The regiment included 17 officers from the family and was the only Swiss mercenary force active on four continents.

== Commercial activities ==
Trade was a domain where the Meurons were particularly active, investing in the promising sectors of 18th-century Neuchâtel economy (cotton printing, watchmaking, lace). Several family members created enterprises abroad, some of which were flourishing.

=== Colonial plantations ===
The brothers Pierre Etienne de Meuron (1742-1817), Jean Frédéric de Meuron (1744), and François de Meuron (1745-1823) were active notably in the Antilles and Suriname. From 1779, Pierre Etienne de Meuron managed, first with his brother François (until 1782), then alone (1783-1786), the administration of plantations belonging to Jacques-Louis de Pourtalès and Johann Jakob Thurneysen (1729-1784) on the island of Grenada. The two largest, the sugar cane plantations Clavier and Larcher, each employed approximately 160 slaves.

David-Henri de Meuron was a merchant of colonial goods in Lisbon, where he took over the business of David de Pury in association with David Schwab from Bienne, with whom he also owned a cotton printing factory. Auguste-Frédéric de Meuron, known as "Meuron de Bahia," built a considerable fortune in Brazil in the production and trade of snuff tobacco. His factories in Salvador de Bahia, then in Rio de Janeiro (Andarahy Pequeno) and Pernambuco (Chora Menino) were equipped with steam engines and operated through the labor of enslaved people.

== Cultural and artistic contributions ==
The Meurons also participated actively in the cultural and artistic life of their region of origin. Daniel de Meuron (1744-1820), correspondent of the Journal littéraire de Lausanne, and Henri de Meuron (1752-1813), first librarian of the Neuchâtel city library, were instrumental in publishing the works of naturalist Charles Bonnet and were founding members of two public utility societies (Société d'émulation patriotique de Neuchâtel, Société du jeudi) and the Société de lecture.

Louis de Meuron (1780-1847), author of several publications, was the sole editor of the Véritable Messager boiteux de Neuchâtel (see Messager boiteux) for about twelve years. Charles-Daniel de Meuron donated collections to Neuchâtel that formed the origins of the museums of ethnography, natural history, and history.

The Meurons also produced renowned painters: Albert de Meuron, Louis de Meuron, and Maximilien de Meuron, pillars of artistic life in Neuchâtel. They demonstrated their attachment to the Canton of Neuchâtel through their personal commitment or their donations. When called abroad by their occupations, they returned to live their retirement in their homeland.

Aglaé Meuron (1836-1925) was a painter in Corsica after training in Paris in the studio of Léon Cogniet and Marie-Amélie Cogniet.

== Healthcare and philanthropy ==
Auguste-Frédéric de Meuron, after making his fortune in Brazil, founded at his own expense, but in agreement with the State, the Préfargier health institution (Marin-Epagnier), intended for the mentally ill, to which generations of Meurons devoted themselves. At the beginning of the 21st century, the foundation was still presided over by a member of the family.

Augustine Emilie Euphrosine Meuron, known as Lasthénie (1844-1926), daughter of Adolphe Meuron (1803-1887), married to Timothée Landry, president of the Court of Appeal of Paris, bequeathed at her death 275,000 francs to charitable works of the City and canton of Neuchâtel.

Esabeau de Meuron (1757-1849), who married colonel Charles Samuel de Tribolet, founded the Prébarreau hospice in Neuchâtel which she directed for more than 30 years.

== Properties and family organization ==
Numerous residences and properties were attached to the Meuron name, in the cantons of Neuchâtel, Bern, Vaud, and in France. A family fund has existed since 1791. Long reserved only to men bearing the surname, it recently opened to women; it publishes every ten years a genealogical record of the lineage.

== Bibliography ==
- Meuron, Guy de: Le Régiment Meuron, 1781-1816, 1982.
- Meuron, Guy de: Histoire d'une famille neuchâteloise. La famille Meuron, 1991.
- Röthlin, Niklaus: "Koloniale Erfahrungen im letzten Drittel des 18. Jahrhunderts. Die Plantagen der Firmen Thurneysen aus Basel und Pourtalès aus Neuenburg auf der westindischen Insel Grenada", in: Basler Zeitschrift für Geschichte und Altertumskunde, 91, 1991, pp. 129-146.
- David, Thomas; Etemad, Bouda; Schaufelbuehl, Janick Marina: La Suisse et l'esclavage des Noirs, 2005.
- Veyrassat, Béatrice: Histoire de la Suisse et des Suisses dans la marche du monde (XVIIe siècle-Première Guerre mondiale). Espaces – Circulations – Echanges, 2018.
