= Salisbury bell foundry =

English manufacturer of large bells, c.1220–1731

- Operated: c. 1220– 1731
- Location: Salisbury, Wiltshire, England
- Industry: Metalworking
- Products: Bells
- Owner(s): Purdue, Wallis families

The Salisbury Bell Foundry at Salisbury, in Wiltshire, England, was operated from at least 1420 (but possibly as early as 1220) until 1731. The surnames of notable master bell-founders include Purdue and Wallis.

== History of the foundry ==
Salisbury cathedral moved from Old Sarum to Salisbury (New Sarum) in 1220, and Lukis has speculated that a bell foundry was established at the same time. Certainly there was a foundry in Salisbury by 1480, as in that year a new bell was cast for the cathedral. That bell was for the belfry, which was demolished by James Wyatt in 1790, the bells having been sold. Only William III Purdue's 1661 service bell remains from the Salisbury bell foundry's bells at the cathedral.

According to Lukis, the earliest record of a bell being cast in Salisbury dates from 1443 for St Edmund's Church, Salisbury (now the Salisbury Arts Centre), although Dove's lists one of the bells at St Nicholas, Sandford Orcas as having been cast in 1420.

The earliest recorded bell-founder is one Henry Pynkere in 1465. Pynkere was still the bell-founder in 1495, when he recast the treble and fourth bells for St Edmund's. For 140 years the bell-founders were members of the Wallis family.

The foundry was at Culver Street, which was formerly known as Bell-founder's Street. The foundry closed in 1731 and nothing remains of it; most of Culver Street is now (2022) a car park.

== Status ==
Salisbury was the chief centre of bell-founding in Wiltshire. There was a foundry at Aldbourne throughout the 18th century and into the early 19th century, and individual founders worked at Devizes and Warminster. The Salisbury foundry made bells for many churches in southern Wiltshire and the adjacent parts of Dorset and Hampshire.

== List of founders ==
Lukis records the founders as follows, and explains that the overlapping dates arise from partnerships or from their roles – such as furnace superintendent and mould-maker – in the various departments of the busy foundry.

- Henry Pynkere, 1465–1495
- John Wallis, 1495–1530
- John Wallis, 1580–1633
- Richard Tucke, 1624
- John Danton, 1624–1637
- William Purdue, 1596–1607
- Roger Purdue, 1611–1623
- William Purdue, 1641–1669
- Roger Purdue, 1650–1680
- John Lett, 1600–1629
- John Lett, 1640–1685
- E Lett, 1711
- Nathaniel Bolter, 1654–1664
- Jonathan Bolter, 1656
- Francis Foster, 1655–1666
- F Florey, 1654
- Richard Florey, 1675–1679
- Clement Tosier, 1679–1727
- William Tosier, 1721–1731
- John Tosier, 1724

== Legacy ==
Dove's Guide lists 530 surviving bells cast by the Purdues alone, with a further 200 by John Wallis (1580–1624), and five more survivors cast by Richard Florey. Despite this large number of surviving bells, there is very little published material about the foundry, and the only comprehensive study is an 1859 article by the Rev WC Lukis in the Journal of the British Archaeological Association.

In addition to the English bells listed in Dove's, William and Roger Purdue were itinerant bell-founders and went to Ireland where they cast six bells for St Canice's Cathedral in Kilkenny in 1674. They also cast the sixth and seventh bells of the peal at St Patrick's Cathedral, Dublin.
