= Louisa Collings =

British lichenologist

- Born: Louisa Elizabeth Lukis; 4 June 1818 or 1828
- Died: 24 March 1887; Folkestone, England
- Spouse: William Thomas Collings
- Children: William Frederick Collings and five others
- Parent(s): Frederick Lukis; Elizabeth Collings

Louisa Elizabeth Collings (née Lukis; 4 June 1818 or 1828 – 24 March 1887) was an amateur lichenologist and natural history collector from the Channel Islands. She is the ancestor of all the subsequent Seigneurs of Sark through her children with husband William Thomas Collings.

== Early life ==
Collings was born either on 4 June 1818 or in 1828 to Elizabeth (née Collings) and Frederick Lukis, the eldest of three daughters. Her parents were first cousins, and her father was a leading Channel Islands naturalist, collector and antiquarian. Due to the early 19th-century views on female education, Collings and her sisters probably did not receive any formal schooling. Her interest in lichens was most likely due to the influence of her father, from whom she probably inherited many local specimens. Her brother, William Collings Lukis, also shared their father's interests.

== Lichen collecting ==
Collings swapped her specimens with other collectors, including the family friend, Charles du Bois Larbalestier of Jersey, eventually amassing a collection of over 1,300 lichens held in a set of 32 folders and small box files. In 1862 she compiled a list of 150 species of lichens that appear on the island of Guernsey, and presented it to the geologist David T. Ansted, who was working on a book about the Channel Islands.

When she died her collection was entrusted to the newly established Guille-Allès Museum, the first museum in Guernsey. The museum closed in 1970 and the collection can now be found in the Guernsey Museum.

== Personal life ==
Louisa Lukis married her cousin, clergyman William Thomas Collings, on 15 June 1847. The ceremony was conducted by her brother, Rev. William Collings Lukis, at St Saviour's Church. The couple had four daughters and two sons, William Frederick (1852–1927) and Henry de Vic (1855–1872). Her mother-in-law Marie Collings had bought the Seigneurship of Sark in 1852, and on her death in 1853, Louisa Collings' husband became Seigneur of Sark. She was widowed in 1882, at which point the fief of Sark passed to her son William Frederick Collings. The current Christopher Beaumont, 23rd Seigneur of Sark is Collings' direct descendant.

In 1887 Collings decided to pay a visit to her eldest daughter, Mary Edmeades, who lay ill in Folkestone. She died there on 24 March, shortly after her daughter, having suffered from bronchitis for three days. She outlived all her children except for the Seigneur; her other daughters died respectively in 1851, 1859 and 1871.
