= James Milner, 9th Seigneur of Sark =

9th Seigneur of Sark (d. 1730)

James Milner, 9th Seigneur of Sark (died 1730) bought the fief of Sark from John Johnson in 1723 for £5,000, and was Seigneur of Sark until 1730. His heir and son-in-law, Joseph Wilcocks, the incumbent Bishop of Gloucester, sold the fief to Susanne le Pelley without ever claiming the title of Seigneur.

Preceded by John Johnson	Seigneur of Sark; 1723–1730	Succeeded by Susanne le Pelley
