= William Collings Lukis =

Rev. William Collings Lukis MA. FSA (8 April 1817 in Guernsey – 7 December 1892 in Wath, North Riding of Yorkshire) was a British antiquarian, archeologist and polymath.

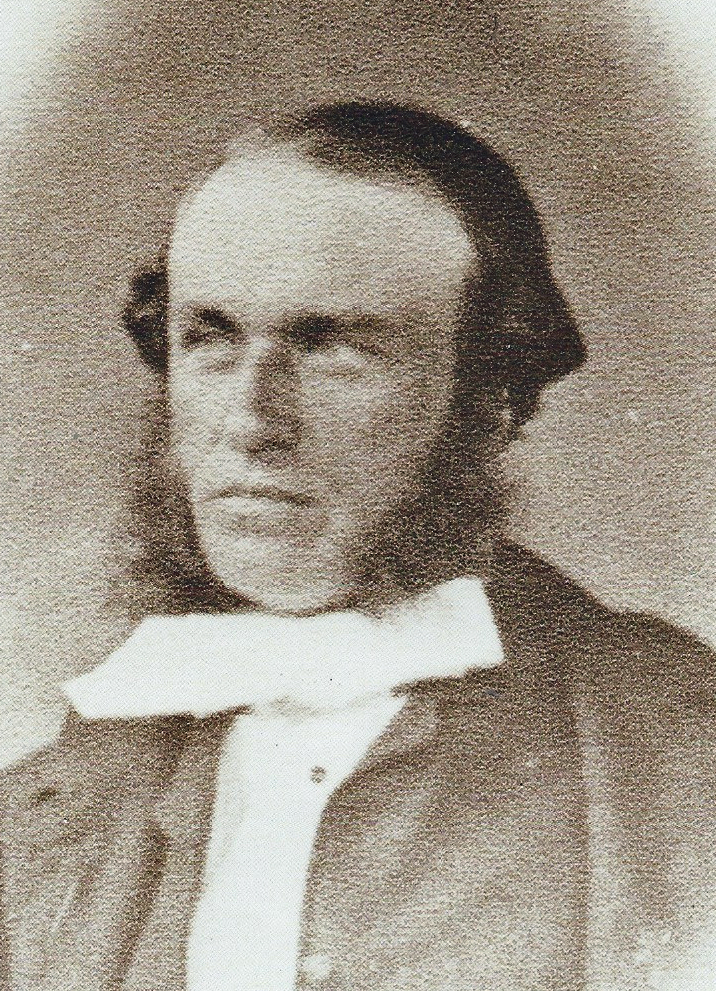
William Collings Lukis (1817-1892)

William Collings Lukis was the third son of Frederick Corbin Lukis, the Colonel of Guernsey Militia. He was educated at Trinity College, Cambridge. He was married to Lucy Adelaide, daughter of Admiral Sir Thomas Fellowes.

Lukis is best remembered in England for his work on Church Bells which was published in 1857. He was the first person to publish a collection of bell descriptions, chiefly from Wiltshire. He was a founder member of the Wiltshire Archaeological and Natural History Society and an authority on perspective drawing. It is his drawings of the Saxon church in Bradford on Avon, where he was curate from 1841 to 1846, that formed the basis for the illustrations for WH Jones's article on the Saxon Church in WAM V, and acknowledged by Jones in WAM XIII.

Lukis is also remembered for his work on the megaliths of Great Britain and France; with his university friend Sir Henry Dryden he surveyed the megalithic monuments of Brittany. He was ordained in Salisbury in 1845, and after holding several livings in Wiltshire he moved to Wath in Yorkshire, where he carried out a number of excavations. He published a treatise on ancient church plate in 1845 and was a regular contributor to the journals of the British Archaeological Association and other learned societies. His collection of artefacts was bought by the British Museum after his death.

His sister Louisa was married to William Thomas Collings, Seigneur of Sark, and is the ancestor of the island's ruler until 2016, Michael Beaumont.

== Works ==
- Prehistoric Stone Monuments of the British Isles: Cornwall With 40 tinted litho plates, accurately drawn to scale by W. C. Lukis and W. C. Borlase. Society of Antiquaries, 1885.
- An Account of Church Bells: With Some Notices of Wiltshire Bells and Bell Founders. Containing a copious List of Founders, a comparative scale of tenor bells, and inscriptions from nearly five hundred parishes in various parts of the Kingdom. 1857.
- A Guide to the Principal Chambered Barrows and other Pre-historic Monuments in the Islands of the Morbihan, the communes of Locmariaker, Carnac, Plouharnel and Erdeven, and the peninsulas of Quiberon and Rhuis, Brittany. 1875.
- On the class of rude stone monuments which are commonly called in England cromlechs, and in France dolmens, and are here shown to have been the sepulchral chambers of once-existing mounds. Prevailing errors on the subject refuted by a critical examination of the monuments referred to by the maintainers of these errors. 1875.
- "Danish Cromlechs and Burial Customs compared with those of Brittany, the Channel Islands, and Great Britain". Wiltshire Archaeological and Natural History Magazine 8 (1864) pp. 145–69.
- A Pocket guide to the principal rude Stone monuments of Brittany. 1875.
- Specimens of Ancient Church Plate. 1845.
