= Frederick Lukis =

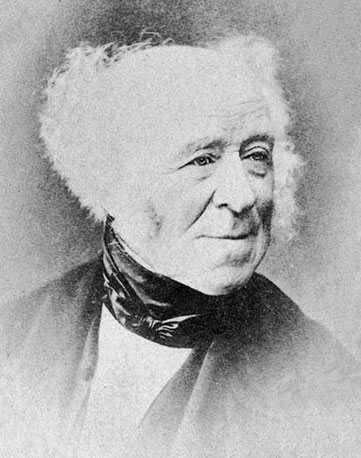
- Born: Frederick Corbin Lukis; 24 February 1788; Saint Peter Port, Guernsey, Channel Islands
- Died: 15 November 1871 (aged 83); Saint Peter Port, Guernsey, Channel Islands
- Spouse: Elizabeth Lukis (née Collings)
- Children: John Walter Lukis; Louisa Collings; William Collings Lukis; François du Bois Lukis; and five others
- Parent(s): John Lukis; Sarah Lukis (née Collings)

Frederick Corbin Lukis FSA (24 February 1788 – 15 November 1871) was a British archaeologist, naturalist, collector, and antiquarian.

== Background ==
Lukis was born in La Grange, Saint Peter Port, Guernsey. He was the youngest of the four children of Sarah (née Collings; 1749–1816) and Captain John Lukis (1753–1832). His father was a member of the Royal Guernsey militia who made a fortune in the "slightly murky world" of privateering and importing expensive wine. Already in his youth Lukis became interested in natural history, and probably attended Elizabeth College.

== Career ==
He was strongly influenced by his elderly relative, the botanist Joshua Gosselin (1739–1813), who took him to his first excavation at a recently discovered artificial cavern. The experience triggered a lifelong passion for the protection of the island's heritage. He became a member of the Society of Antiquaries of London on 28 April 1853, but never published in the Society's journal, Archaeologia. Like his father, he served in the island's militia, becoming a colonel and aide-de-camp to the island's last governor William Keppel.

== Family ==
On 17 February 1813, Lukis married his first cousin, Elizabeth Collings (1791–1865). They had three daughters and six sons, some of whom inherited his interests. John Walter Lukis (1816–1894), his second son, was a mining engineer and excavator; the eldest daughter, Louisa Collings, was a lichenologist; his third son, William Collings Lukis, was an antiquarian and archaeologist; the fifth son, François du Bois Lukis (1826–1907), was a lieutenant and archaeologist. His youngest daughter, Mary-Anne (1822–1906), provided watercolour sketches of Lukis' artefacts. Lukis died at the house he was born in. Lukis' collection was donated by his son François du Bois to the Guernsey Museum, and forms its nucleus. His living descendants include the actor Adrian Lukis; Christopher Beaumont, 23rd Seigneur of Sark.
