= Auguste-Frédéric de Meuron =

Swiss industrialist and entrepreneur in Brazil (1789–1852)

Auguste-Frédéric de Meuron (August 26, 1789 – April 1, 1852) was a Swiss industrialist and entrepreneur in Brazil, also known as Meuron de Bahia.

== Life ==
=== Family ===
Auguste-Frédéric de Meuron came from the Meuron family and was the son of Charles-Louis de Meuron (January 4, 1748 – 1812) and his wife Suzanne-Catherine (April 11, 1761 – November 29, 1828), the daughter of an officer in French service (see Swiss troops in French service for the House of Bourbon, 1589–1792) Frédéric-François Perregaux (1716–1790). He had three siblings.

His uncle was the banker Jean-Frédéric Perregaux (1744–1808). Among his ancestors was Catherine-Françoise de Wattenwyl, who was sentenced to death and later exiled after harsh torture for espionage services for King Louis XIV of France. Distant relatives included the mercenary leader and later British Lieutenant General Charles-Daniel de Meuron and his brother Pierre-Frédéric de Meuron, military governor of Sri Lanka.

In 1845, Auguste-Frédéric de Meuron married Elisabeth-Augustine (1805, Neuchâtel – 1854), the daughter of the State Councilor and lieutenant colonel Charles-Albert de Pury (1752–1833), who had received the noble title of baron in 1820. The marriage remained childless.

In 1840, he acquired a castle in Dully, a house on the Champs-Élysées in Paris, and the Château Frayé in the French Seine-et-Oise department.

After his death, he left a fortune of four to five million Swiss francs. His executors were André Bonjour and Gabriel Friedrich Julius May (1791–1870) from Bern, with whom he had founded a company in Salvador da Bahia. His 1851 will provided for the emancipation of several enslaved people in his Brazilian factories.

=== Career ===
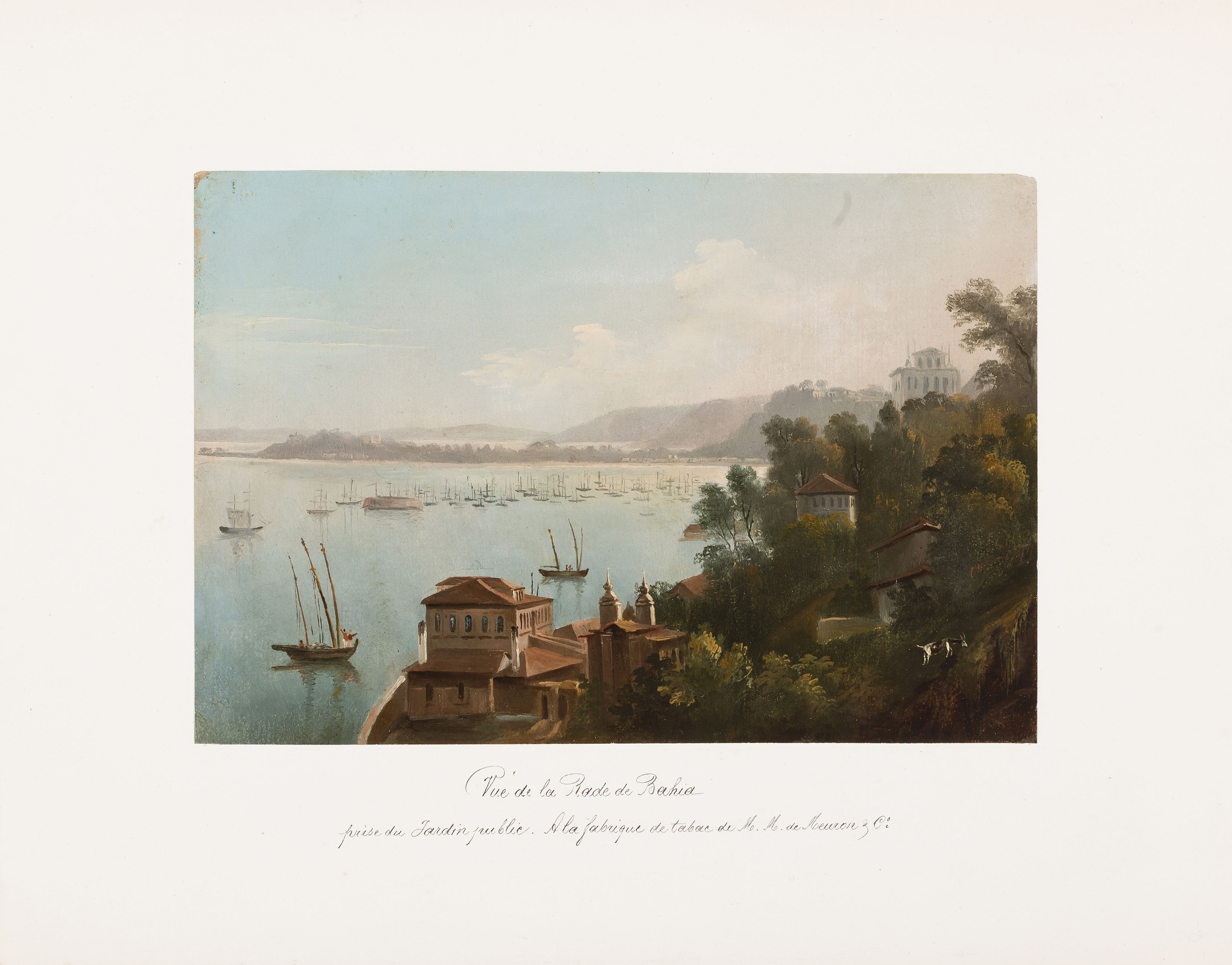
View of the Bay of Bahia, 1837

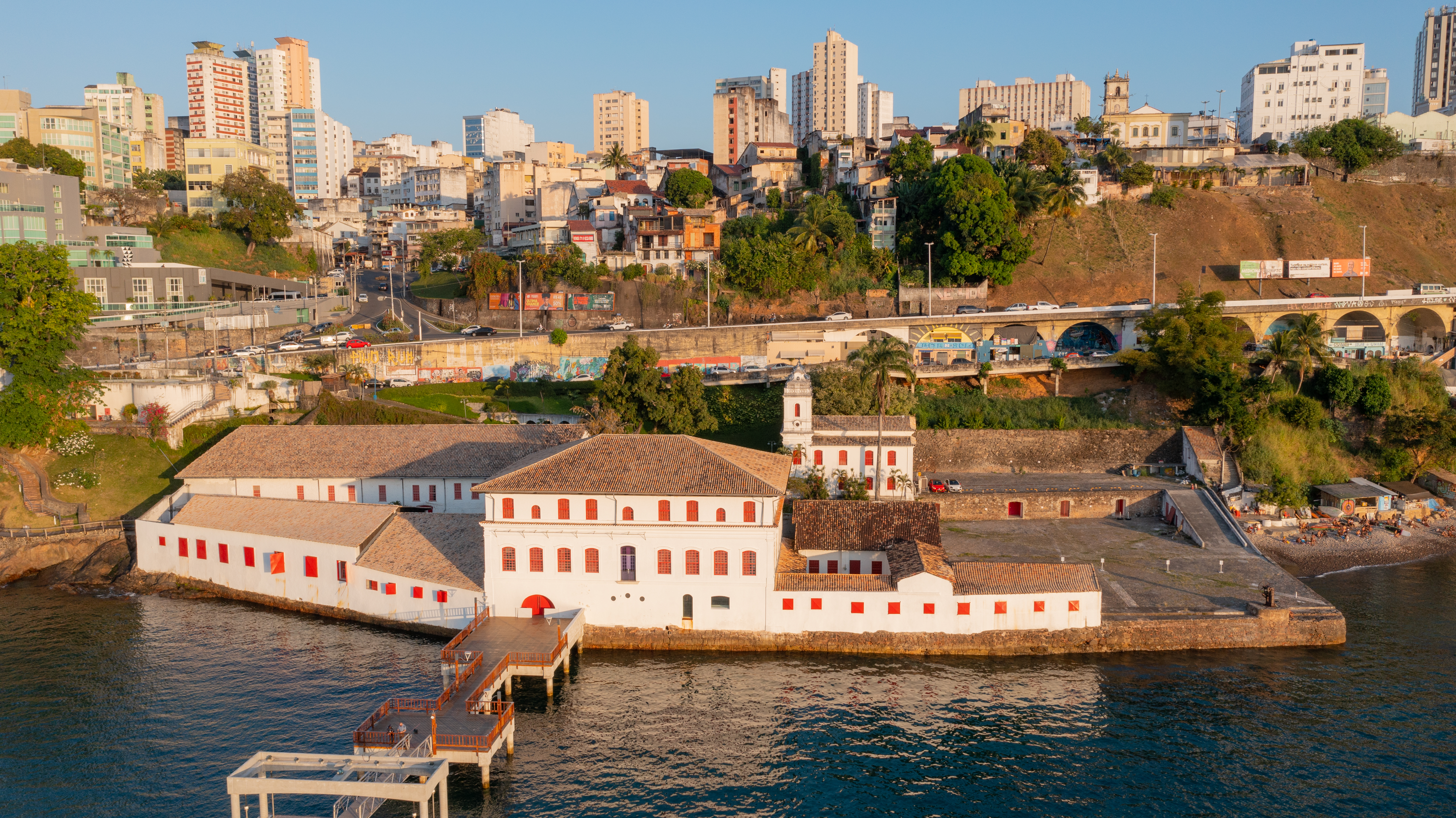
Museu de Arte Moderna da Bahia, formerly a tobacco factory

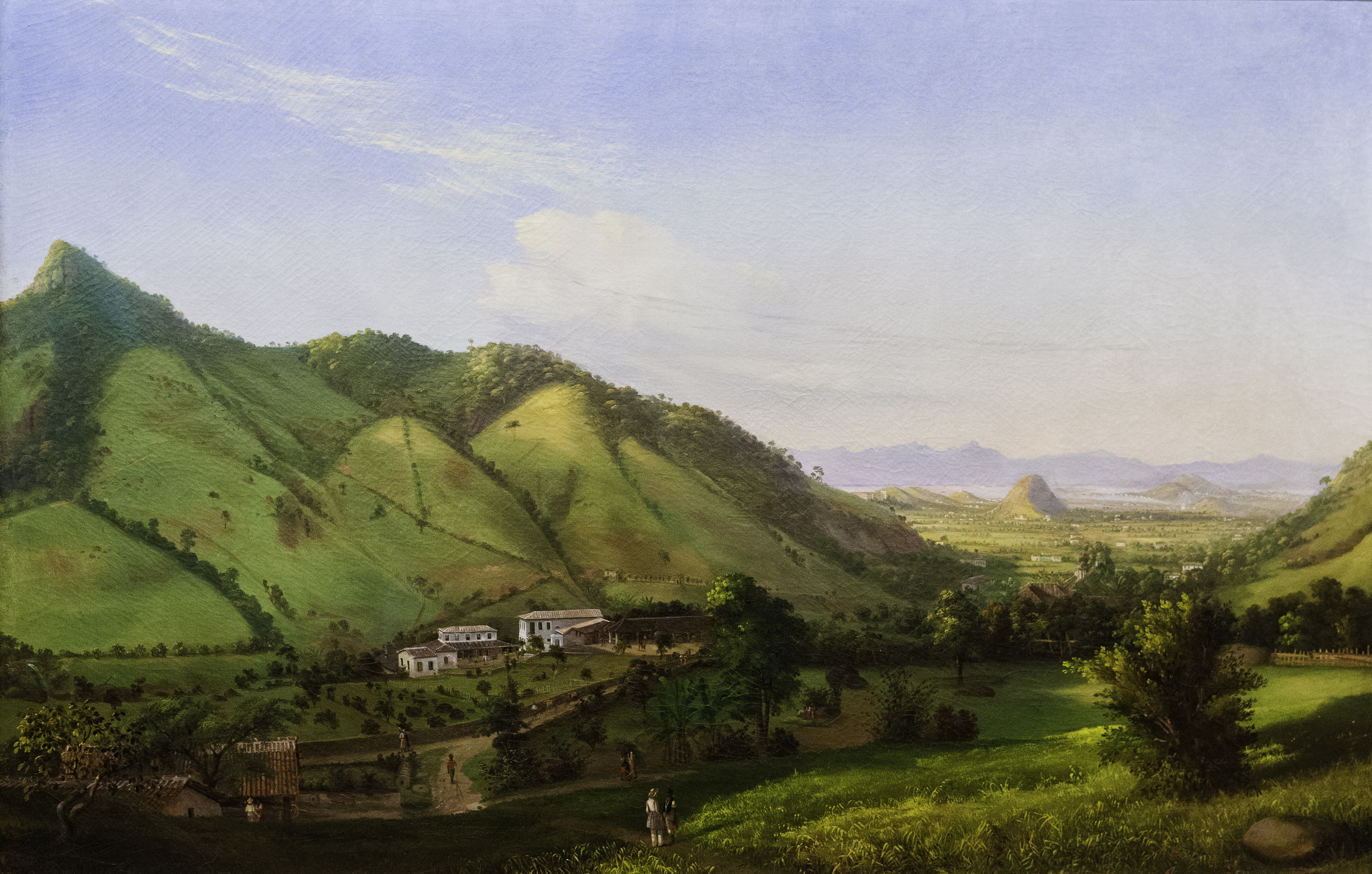
Snuff factory in Andaraí

After commercial training, Auguste-Frédéric de Meuron settled in Paris in 1809 to continue his education at the Banque Perregaux-Laffitte et Cie., founded in 1781 by Jean-Frédéric Perregaux, and at the trading house Jacques Coulon, Paul Boyve et Cie.. He later stayed in London and New York and traveled to Lisbon between 1810 and 1815, where he worked in the trading and banking business of David-Henri de Meuron and his nephew Edouard de Meuron. In 1816, together with David-Henri de Meuron, Edouard de Meuron, and Auguste Gouhard from Neuchâtel, he founded the commission business Meuron et Cie., based in Salvador da Bahia, Brazil, specializing in the transport of colonial goods to Europe. Although the company was not profitable, it laid the foundation for Auguste-Frédéric de Meuron’s career in the Americas.

From 1817, he lived in Salvador da Bahia. In 1819, he ended his partnership with his business associates and instead entered the snuff production business with Gabriel Friedrich Julius May (1791–1870). The business soon flourished, and they later produced nearly half of Brazil’s snuff. The company opened its first tobacco factory in Arêa Preta; in 1826, production was moved to a former sugarcane factory in Solar do Unhão in the Bay of Salvador da Bahia, now home to the Museu de Arte Moderna da Bahia. Further branches were established in 1832 in Andarai Pequeno, now the Barra da Tijuca district of Rio de Janeiro, managed by Vaud native Benjamin Samuel Dapples, and in 1836 in Chora Menino in the Pernambuco region. The factories were equipped with steam engines and relied on slave labor. For example, in Andarai Pequeno, around 1855, 24 people worked, 18 of whom were enslaved.

In 1837, he returned to Europe permanently for health reasons but continued to oversee his American businesses through his partners. The company Meuron et Cie. existed until 1892, changed its name several times, and was dissolved in 1949.

Back in Neuchâtel, he made extensive investments in real estate in Switzerland and France, including the purchase of Dully Castle and several properties and lands in Paris and the Île-de-France region.

Auguste-Frédéric de Meuron’s substantial wealth was inseparably linked to slavery, which remained prevalent in Brazil’s tobacco cultivation and snuff production.

=== Social Contributions ===
In 1829, Auguste-Frédéric de Meuron made a donation to the Neuchâtel Library.

In 1830, he sent approximately 200 Brazilian birds from Bahia to the Natural History Museum in Neuchâtel.

Préfargier Clinic

He bequeathed part of his fortune to public causes, such as the Bahia province through the Legado Meuron, partly designated for charitable purposes.

In Neuchâtel, he founded a hospice for the mentally ill, the Maison de santé de Préfargier in Marin-Epagnier, in 1844, which was inaugurated on December 27, 1848. He provided 600,000 Swiss francs for this project. He commissioned the French architect Pierre-François-Nicolas Philippon (1784–1866) for the construction. Neuchâtel architects Louis Châtelain (1805–1885) and later Léo Châtelain (1839–1913) implemented Philippon’s vision and designed renovations and expansions until the early 20th century. At the inauguration, the third mental health hospital in Switzerland, a Grand Council deputation announced that the facility would be exempt from taxes and municipal fees, would never serve as a military quarter, and that its employees would be exempt from militia service. Initially, Auguste-Frédéric de Meuron planned to hand over the facility to the state upon completion. However, the Neuchâtel Revolution of 1848 led him to establish an independent foundation to manage the Maison de Santé de Préfargier, which he led until his death in 1852.

== Bibliography ==
- "Auguste-Frédéric de Meuron". In: Bülletin von heute morgen. In: Eidgenössische Zeitung, April 4, 1852, p. 379 (Digitalisat).
- "Auguste-Frédéric de Meuron". In: Schweiz. In: St. Galler Zeitung, April 8, 1852, p. 334 (Digitalisat).
- "Auguste-Frédéric de Meuron". In: Le Véritable messager boiteux de Neuchâtel pour l’an. 1853, pp. 42–47 (Digitalisat).
- "Auguste-Frédéric de Meuron". In: Schweiz. In: Neue Zürcher Zeitung, June 27, 1858, p. 711 (Digitalisat).
- "Auguste-Frédéric de Meuron". In: Frédéric-Alexandre Jeanneret: Biographie neuchâteloise, Volume 2. Locle, 1863, pp. 72–80 (Digitalisat).
- "Auguste-Frédéric de Meuron". In: Les de Meuron, ces coureurs de planète. In: Feuille d’Avis de Neuchâtel, February 27, 1992, p. 43 (Digitalisat).
- "Auguste-Frédéric de Meuron". In: Béatrice Veyrassat: Réseaux d’affaires internationaux, émigrations et exportations en Amérique latine au XIXe^{e} siècle. Geneva, 1993, p. 428 (Digitalisat).
- "Auguste-Frédéric de Meuron". In: Wirtschaftswachstum dank Sklavenhandel?, pp. 21–22 (Digitalisat).
