= William Thomas Collings =

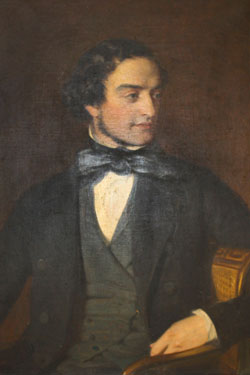

Seigneur of Sark
- In office 1853–1882
- Preceded by: Marie Collings
- Succeeded by: William Frederick Collings

Personal details
- Born: 4 September 1823
- Died: 7 March 1882 (aged 58)
- Spouse: Louisa Collings (née Lukis)
- Children: William Frederick Collings and five others
- Parent(s): Marie Collings (née Allaire); Thomas Guerin Collings

William Thomas Collings (4 September 1823 – 7 March 1882) was a clergyman of the Church of England who served as Seigneur of Sark from 1853 to 1882.

== Ecclesiastical career ==
Collings was the son of Marie and Thomas Guerin Collings (1786–1832). His maternal grandfather, the Guernsey privateer John Allaire, was mortgaged the fief of Sark by the island's seigneur, Ernest le Pelley, in 1844. By 1852, both the Seigneur and Collings' grandfather were dead. The Seigneur's successor, Pierre Carey le Pelley, was unable to pay the mortgage and thus had to sell Sark to Marie Collings, Allaire's heiress. Collings was ordained a deacon of the Church of England the same year at the Wells Cathedral, where he served as curate prior to being ordained as a priest the following year. The Guernsey historian James Marr denies that he ever became canon of the Wells Cathedral, calling it a "frequently repeated but entirely false assertion".

== Seigneurship ==
Collings' mother died only a year after becoming ruler of Sark, and he inherited the fief. Much like the Le Pelleys had done when they purchased the fief a century earlier, Collings used the family fortune–acquired by privateering–to expand and renovate his residence, La Seigneurie. Like his predecessor, he bought the neighbouring tenement and thus gained third vote in the Chief Pleas.

As seigneur, Collings was keen on improving the welfare of the community. He improved schooling and encouraged the construction of small hotels, seeking to encourage the newly developed industry of tourism. His priority was to provide for the defence of the island, whose militia he was very proud of. Collings was determined to make up for the years of his predecessors' seigneurial neglect, and he used his personal resources for that end. In 1855, in keeping with his ecclesiastical background, Collings gave land to the church for a new cemetery and, striving to discourage vice, had a prison constructed on the island. In 1864, he offered a house for the use of Sark's schoolmaster on the condition that he was an Anglican, and in doing so greatly offended the numerous Methodists in the Chief Pleas. He was a member of the Photographic Society from 1853 to 1854.

Collings loved Sark but, like the Pelleys, only used it as a summer residence, preferring to spend winters in the neighbouring island of Guernsey. On 28 November 1872, Collings was sailing from Sark to spend the winter on Guernsey when the vessel hit a rock and sank. The Seigneur narrowly escaped drowning, but never recovered his baggage, which contained the original charter of Queen Elizabeth I's 1565 grant of Sark to Helier de Carteret. A copy of the charter remains preserved in the Public Record Office in London.

== Family ==
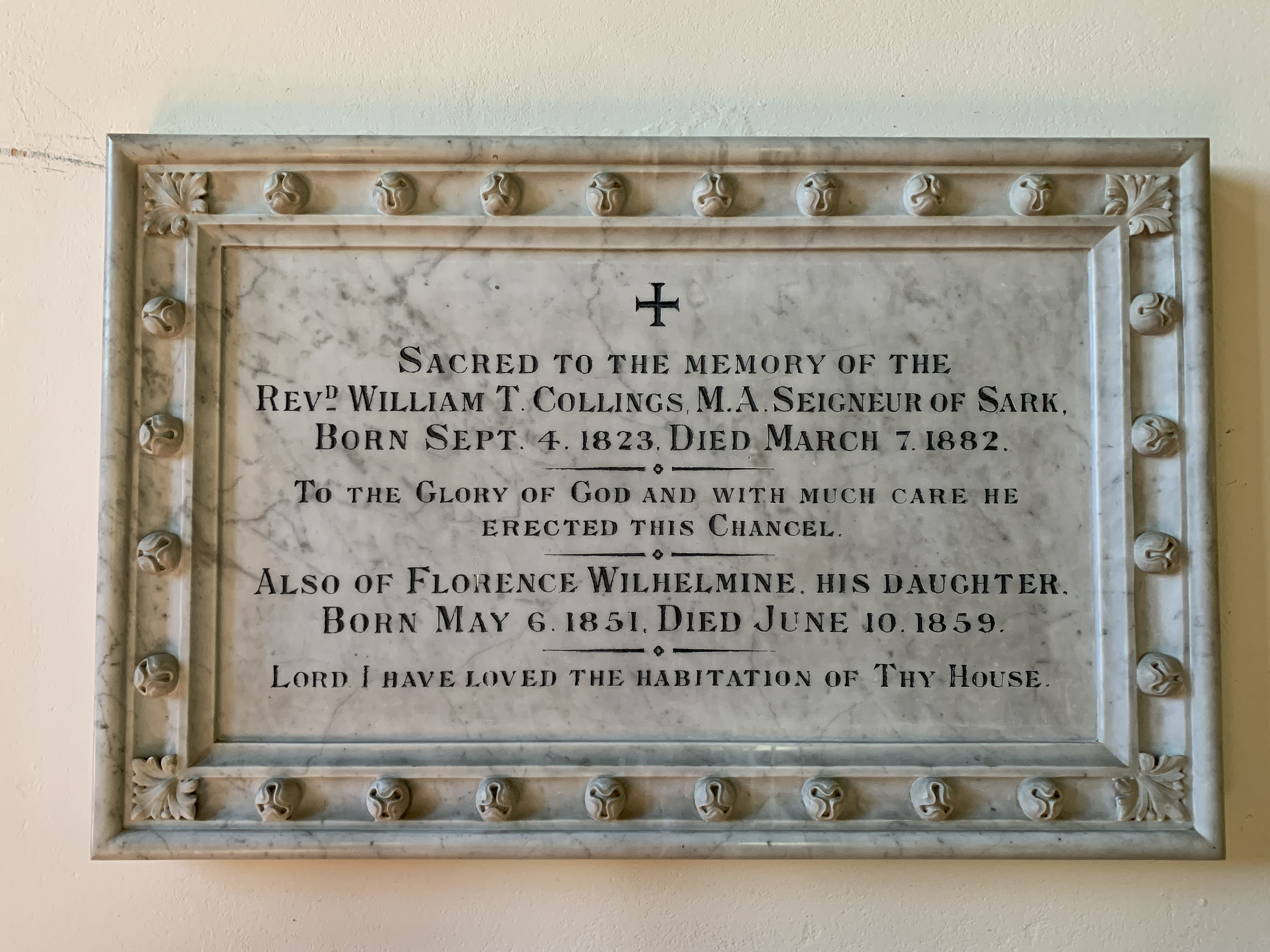
Memorial in St Peter's Church, Sark

Collings married his cousin Louisa Lukis, an amateur lichenologist and collector, on 15 June 1847. The ceremony was conducted by her brother, William Collings Lukis, at St Saviour's Church. They had four daughters and two sons, William Frederick (1852–1927) and Henry de Vic (1855–1872). William Frederick, the heir apparent, was the exact opposite of his father, and the two never got along. Collings was succeeded by his son upon his death on 7 March 1882. He was outlived by his wife, elder son and eldest daughter, Mary Edmeades.

Preceded by Marie Collings	Seigneur of Sark; 1853–1882	Succeeded by William Frederick Collings
