= 2018 Guernsey electoral system referendum =

Referendum in Guernsey

10 October 2018
- Which electoral system should Guernsey use to elect deputies?
- Voting system: Instant-runoff voting
- Outcome: Option A: 38 deputies elected island-wide every 4 years
- Website: www.gov.gg/referendum

First round
Option A	37.5%
Option B	24.6%
Option C	26.5%
Option D	4.7%
Option E	6.6%

Final round
Option A	52.48%
Option B	0%
Option C	47.52%
Option D	0%
Option E	0%
Voter turnout: 45.1%

A referendum on electoral reform was held on 10 October 2018 in Guernsey to determine an electoral system for elections to the States of Guernsey. Voters were asked to rank five different proposed electoral systems, with a run-off system used to determine the winning proposal. Option A, a 38-member constituency covering the whole island, won the vote. As a result of voter turnout (45%) being above the 40% vote threshold, the referendum was binding.

== Vote counting system ==
The referendum itself used instant-runoff voting, also called the alternative vote. In the initial count, only first choices were counted. As no proposal received a majority of the vote, the proposal that received the fewest votes was eliminated; any ballots with this proposal as first choice were redistributed to the other options according to the second preference. This process was repeated until a proposal had a majority of the votes.

A quorum of 40% voter turnout was required for the result to be binding, following a promise by the States.

== Electoral system proposals ==
Voters were presented with five options for a new electoral system Aspects of the pre-existing electoral system preserved by all five options were fixed-term elections and plurality block voting, in which each voter can vote for as many candidates as there are seats in the constituency. All but one option preserved the practice of holding a general election every four years.

- Option A: One 38-member constituency covering Guernsey, Herm, and Jethou. Deputies would serve four-year terms.
- Option B: Seven constituencies with five or six seats. Deputies would serve four-year terms.
- Option C: Seven district constituencies with three, four or five seats, and one 10-member constituency covering Guernsey, Herm, and Jethou; voters would vote in one district constituency and also the at-large constituency. Deputies would serve four-year terms.
- Option D: Four constituencies with 9, 10 or 11 seats. Deputies would serve four-year terms.
- Option E: A single 38-member constituency covering Guernsey, Herm, and Jethou, with one-third of the members (12 or 13) elected every two years for a six-year term.

== Results ==
Option	First count		Second count		Third count		Fourth count	
Option	Votes	%	Votes	%	Votes	%	Votes	%
A	5,304	37.5	5,390	38.3	5,755	41.5	6,017	52.5
C	3,760	26.5	3,914	27.8	4,220	30.4	5,448	47.5
B	3,486	24.6	3,761	26.7	3,898	28.1	–	–
E	940	6.6	1,004	7.1	–	–	–	–
D	672	4.7	–	–	–	–	–	–
Non-transferable votes (accrued)			93	–	289	–	2,697	–
Invalid/blank votes							217	–
Total							14,379	100
Registered voters/turnout							31,865	45.1
Source: Bailiwick of Guernsey States of Guernsey
