= John Johnson, 8th Seigneur of Sark =

8th Seigneur of Sark

John Johnson, 8th Seigneur of Sark (died 1723) was Seigneur of Sark from 1720 to 1723.

The colonel and former commander of the garrison in Guernsey bought the fief from Lord Carteret in 1720.

| Preceded by John Carteret | Seigneur of Sark; 1720–1723 | Succeeded by James Milner |
