= Mike Norris (businessman) =

British manager (born 1961)

- Born: October 1961 (age 64); Chelmsford, Essex
- Education: University of East Anglia
- Occupation: Businessman
- Known for: CEO of Computacenter

Michael John Norris (born October 1961) is the chief executive officer of Computacenter plc.

== Early life and education ==
Norris was born in Chelmsford and educated in Southend-on-Sea, both in Essex. At school Norris proved to be skilled with mathematics but struggled with dyslexia. After his dyslexia was discovered he was allowed to enter exams 45 minutes earlier than other students to read through his test paper.

Norris has a degree in Computer Science and Mathematics, which he received from the University of East Anglia in 1983.

== Career ==
Norris joined Computacenter as a salesperson in 1984, three years after the company began trading Following promotions in 1988 and 1992, Mike Norris became Computacenter's Chief Executive Officer in 1994.
