= Computacenter =

British multinational

Computacenter plc

- Campus in Hatfield, UK
- Formerly: Computacenter Services Group plc (1995–1998)
- Type: Public
- Traded as: LSE: CCC; FTSE 100 component
- Industry: Information technology; Consulting; Outsourcing
- Founded: 1981
- Founder: Philip Hulme; Peter Ogden
- Headquarters: Hatfield, UK
- Key people: Paulina Campbell (Chairman); Mike Norris (Chief Executive)
- Revenue: ▲£9,193.9 million (2025)
- Operating income: ▲£241.2 million (2025)
- Net income: ▼£157.1 million (2025)
- Number of employees: 20,000 (2026)
- Website: www.computacenter.com

Computacenter plc is a British multinational that provides information technology services to public- and private-sector customers. It is a UK company based in Hatfield, Hertfordshire. The company is listed on the London Stock Exchange and is a constituent of the FTSE 100 Index.

== History ==
Computacenter was founded in the UK in 1981 by Philip Hulme and Peter Ogden. In 1990, it opened Europe's largest PC outlet; in 1991, it was listed by The Independent newspaper as one of the fastest growing independent companies in the UK and, by 1994, it had grown to become the largest privately owned IT company in the UK. Computacenter was floated on the London Stock Exchange in May 1998.

In 2006 the company extended its service facilities to include a new International Service Centre in Barcelona, Spain, and a customer help desk and remote management facility in Cape Town, South Africa. The services in Spain and Cape Town were enhanced when the company acquired Digica, which provides outsourcing and managed IT services to the corporate mid-market and the public sector, in January 2007, and Allnet, which specialises in network integration and structured cabling services, in April 2007.

The company bought the UK-based consulting firm TeamUltra in April 2017, and Misco Solutions in Amstelveen in September 2018. It expanded in North America with the acquisition of the California-based business Fusion Storm in October 2018, and went to buy RD Trading (RDC), which specialises in IT disposal, in August 2019, and the Canadian business Pivot Technology Solutions in September 2020.

In March 2021, in a highly unusual procurement process, the company won contracts worth £241.5 million to supply laptops to disadvantaged children without an open tender. The satirical magazine Private Eye noted that Hulme, who remained a significant shareholder in the company, was also a major donor to the Conservative Party.

A "significant security breach" took place in March 2023 when a Computacenter employee allowed his girlfriend, who was a Chinese citizen, into a server room at Deutsche Bank's headquarters in New York. The girlfriend was seen "physically touching" the servers. However, the manager who reported the issue was dismissed by the company in July 2023.

== Operations ==
Office in Munich, Germany

The company is engaged in the supply, implementation, support and management of information technology systems.

== Sponsorships ==
Computacenter was a sponsor of the Renault Sport F1 Team.

== Social responsibility ==
Computacenter has committed itself to the 10 core principles of United Nations Global Compact. Computacenter also helped Marks & Spencer to meet its WEEE requirements and its 'Plan A' environmental objectives, sending zero IT waste from M&S head office to landfill by 2008.
