= William Frederick Collings =

English lord of Sark (1852–1927)

Seigneur of Sark
- In office 7 March 1882 – 20 June 1927
- Preceded by: William Thomas Collings
- Succeeded by: Sibyl Beaumont

Personal details
- Born: 1852
- Died: 20 June 1927 (aged 74–75)
- Spouse: Sophie Moffatt
- Children: Sibyl Hathaway; Doris Verschoyle
- Parent(s): William Thomas Collings; Louisa Lukis

William Frederick Collings (1852 – 20 June 1927) was Seigneur of Sark from 1882 until his death in 1927. One of the most eccentric lords of the island, he was known for his anti-clericalism, stubbornness, intemperance and generosity.

== Youth ==
Collings was the elder son and one of six children of William Thomas Collings, Seigneur of Sark, and the lichenologist Louisa Collings (née Lukis). An exceptionally tall and well-built blue-eyed man, he was the exact opposite of his father. The two never got along with each other. Collings refused to follow his father into the Church and Trinity College, Cambridge. The compromise was a Grand Tour.

== Seigneurship ==
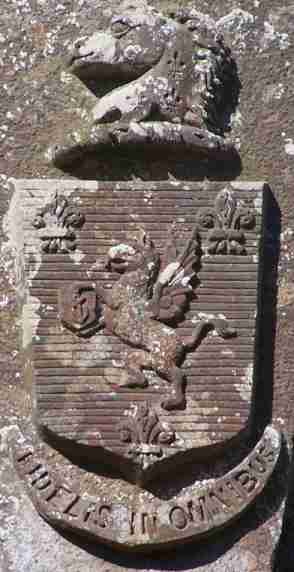
Collings family coat of arms at the gate of the Seigneurie

Collings inherited his father's fief on the latter's death in 1882, but none of his father's interest in military matters. Less than five years after his accession, the Royal Sark Militia, once cherished by his parents, deteriorated into what a visiting journalist described as "seven dozen pairs of boots". By 1900, he had neglected it enough for it to completely disappear. He refused to spend money on maintenance of his fief, but was the first seigneur to be sufficiently fond of it to reside there permanently. In 1899, he refused to sell the island for an enormous amount of money to a man who intended to open a casino there.

The Sarkese admired Collings for his skill in sailing, shooting, and rock climbing, and he enjoyed their strong support. However, he was "a violent terror when he had taken drink", according to an islander. The alcoholism caused him to attack the vicar's wife with his stick, write anticlerical messages on walls, insult the constable, break window panes and ride into private gardens. He once appeared before the Sénéschal for threatening to shoot a journalist. Collings' bitter enemy on the island was the French-born vicar, who often displayed his animosity towards the British by omitting prayers for Queen Victoria and her family, to which the Seigneur responded by stamping out of the church and protesting to the vicar's superiors.

== Family life ==
Collings was devoted to his wife Sophie (née Moffatt), with whom he had two daughters, Sibyl and Doris. As he had no sons, his elder daughter Sibyl was his heiress presumptive. He raised her as a boy and, despite her lameness caused by unequal leg length, taught her to shoot, sail, and climb cliffs. Nevertheless, whenever they came into conflict, he called her a "damned virago". He never allowed either Doris or the physically disabled Sibyl to complain of pain or sadness, explaining that "they would be a lot worse off" when they grew old; Sibyl later expressed gratitude to her father for "being able to live a life free of the inconvenience of self-pity".

The seigneur strongly disapproved of his heiress presumptive's relationship with the painter Dudley Beaumont, considering him a "weakling" because he did not shoot or climb cliffs. When he learned that she had continued seeing him, he threw her out from La Seigneurie in a nightdress. Despite his attempts to find her the next morning, she went to London and married Beaumont. For the first time since her marriage, Collings contacted her when she had her first child, a daughter named Bridget. Wishing to send a conciliatory telegram, he consoled her for giving birth to a daughter by writing: "Sorry it was a vixen." In April 1906, the seigneur and his wife survived a shipwreck, but it worsened her existing illness, leading to her death a few months later.

== Old age and death ==
Collings paid homage to King George V during his and Queen Mary's visit to Guernsey in 1921, becoming the first seigneur of Sark to do so in person since Sir Philip Carteret rendered homage to King Charles II on Jersey in 1650. In his old age, the Seigneur became lenient and stopped requesting the inhabitants to pay him disme. His widowed daughter succeeded him when he died on 20 June 1927, and quickly restored the seigneurial rights. She described her father as "extremely insubordinate, madly obstinate, fiercely self-opinionated and prone to outbreaks of uncontrolled rage," but noted that he was a "generous man" and "never hard on those who found difficulty in paying their rents or dues".

Preceded by William Thomas Collings	Seigneur of Sark; 1882–1927	Succeeded by Sibyl Beaumont
