= Susanne le Pelley =

10th Seigneur and first Dame of Sark

Susanne le Pelley, Dame of Sark (1668 – June 24, 1733) was the 10th Seigneur of Sark from 1730 to 1733. She was the first woman to have the position and rule the fief of Sark.

Susanne le Pelley was the daughter of Judge Jean Le Gros, a member of the Le Gros family, who belonged to the most wealthy landowning families of Guernsey. She married Nicolas le Pelley, a Guernsey privateer owner, and was a widow at the time of her purchase of the seigneurship of Sark. She was the mother of Nicolas le Pelley and Daniel le Pelley.

She bought the fief from James Milner's heir Joseph Wilcocks, the incumbent Bishop of Gloucester. As Dame, she resided at the family tenement Le Perronerie, which became the seigneurie of Sark and official residence of the ruler of Sark, La Seigneurie. She modernised and extended the residence during her rule.

Preceded by James Milner	Dame of Sark; 1730–1733	Succeeded by Nicolas le Pelley
