= Pierre le Pelley II =

Seigneur of Sark

Pierre le Pelley II, 14th Seigneur of Sark (1763–1820) was Seigneur of Sark from 1778 to 1820.

Preceded by Pierre le Pelley I	Seigneur of Sark; 1778–1820	Succeeded by Pierre le Pelley III
