= Michael Anckarsvärd =

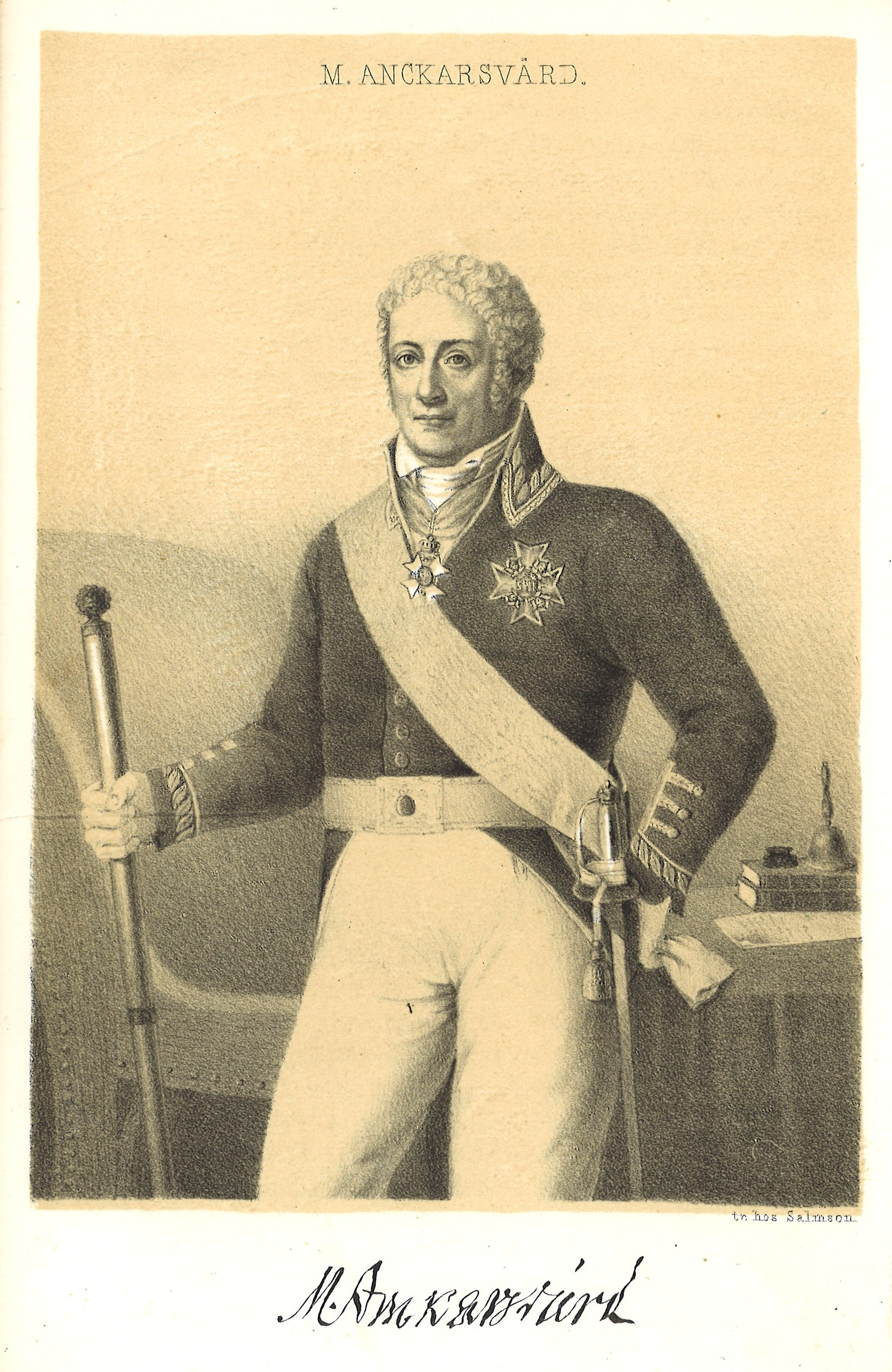
Michael Anckarsvärd

Michael Anckarsvärd (9 March 1742 – 23 March 1838) was a Swedish count, soldier and politician.

Anckarsvärd was born in Högfors. After studying at a university he in 1759 got employment at the fortification and participated as an under-officer and officer in the Pommer war. He had employment partly at the field artillery, and partly at the army naval base. After the war he started working for Carl August Ehrensvärd at the new base in Sveaborg. He was one of the first that in 1772 in trust got to know about Gustav III's plans of revolution.

Anckarsvärd worked for several decades as turns manager, and in 1784 as an eskader manager to work with the progress of the army's fleet of ships. When Gustav III in 1788 prepared for the war against Russia he called for Anckarsvärd to come to Stockholm to give the king advice. After some less fortunate times and an attempt to end the war in 1788, Anckarsvärd was brought to Stockholm and accused of causing an uproar. He was imprisoned from 18 March to 7 May. The case against him was later dropped without an explanation and he was named the king's general adjutant. In 1789, he brought forward plans for the army fleet's next war, which he himself was able to lead the plan ahead. Anckarsvärd was responsible for the fleet that in 1790 won the Battle of Svensksund. After the end of the war, Anckarsvärd was named Governor of Kalmar, a position he held from 1790 until 1810.

Anckarsvärd, under the protection of Gustav IV Adolf, was named general major in 1795 and friherre in 1805, the king even reached out to Anckarsvärd when his rebellious sons Karl Henrik and Johan August had started plans for an uproar against the king in Värmland. At the suggestion of Georg Adlersparre Anckarsvärd led the first Riksdagen session.

Anckarsvärd would work within politics until his death in Karlslund on 23 Mars 1838 at the age of 96.
