= Philip Hulme =

British businessman (born 1948)

Sir Philip William Hulme (born 1948) is the co-founder of Computacenter, one of the United Kingdom's largest computer businesses.

== Career ==
Having graduated at Imperial College, London with a first class degree in engineering, Hulme secured a Harkness Fellowship and joined the MBA Programme at Harvard Business School. He then joined Boston Consulting Group becoming a Vice-President and Director in 1979.

Hulme, together with his former Harvard colleague Peter Ogden founded Computacenter in 1981 and expanded it into one of the United Kingdom's largest computer businesses. When the Company floated on the London Stock Exchange in 1998 Hulme gave much of the proceeds from the sale of his shares to charity. He served as Chairman of Computacenter from 1998 to 2001.

Hulme is also a substantial shareholder in Dealogic, another British computer business.

He was knighted in the 2016 Birthday Honours for services to technology and philanthropy.

In the run-up to the 2024 United Kingdom general election, Hulme donated £25,000 to Reform UK.
