= Peter Ogden (businessman) =

English businessman

Sir Peter Ogden HonFInstP (born 1947) is an English businessman who is one of the founders of Computacenter, one of the United Kingdom's largest computer businesses.

== Education ==
Ogden was born in Rochdale, England. He was educated at Rochdale Grammar School (now Balderstone Technology College). He was awarded a scholarship to University College, Durham in 1965, where he received a BSc in Physics (1968) and a PhD in Theoretical Physics (1971). He continued his education at Harvard Business School, receiving an MBA in Business Studies in 1973.

== Career ==
Ogden's early career was with investment banks, notably Merrill Lynch and Morgan Stanley (where he was a managing director).

In 1981, he founded Computacenter with Philip Hulme, acting as chairman of the company until 1998, when he became a non-executive director.

He established a charitable foundation to pursue his philanthropic interests; The Ogden Trust had an annual expenditure of £1,118,224 in 2006–07.

He was knighted in the 2005 New Year Honours List.

In 1996 Ogden was leaseholder of the Channel Island of Jethou.

Ogden co-owns MotorSport Vision with former Formula One driver Jonathan Palmer. The outfit runs Leicestershire's Donington Park circuit and Ogden's stake in the company is worth £12.5 million.

In May 2024, Ogden's children, Cameron, Edward and Tiffany, bought a controlling share of Rochdale Association Football Club, based in Ogden's home town.
