= Pierre le Pelley III =

15th Seigneur of Sark (1799–1839)

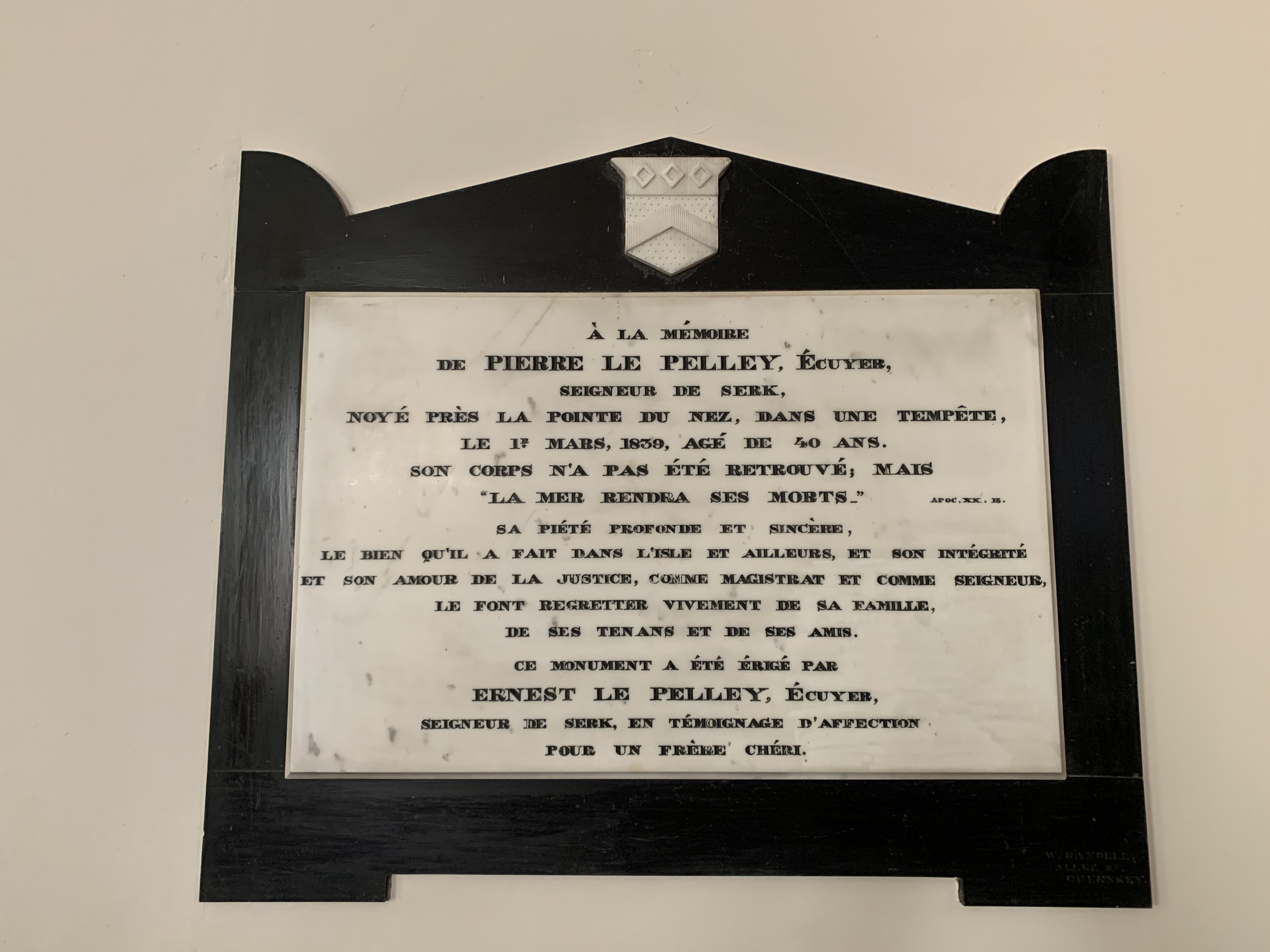
Memorial in St Peter's Church, Sark

Pierre le Pelley III, 15th Seigneur of Sark (1799–1839) was Seigneur of Sark from 1820 to 1839.

In 1834, together with British mining engineer John Hunt, Pierre allowed the development of mines for the extraction of copper and silver on Sark.

In 1835, he purchased the land that would form the La Seigneurie Gardens, among the first formal gardens in the Channel Islands.

He drowned when the boat carrying him to Guernsey was lost in a tidal race just off the coast of Sark. He was succeeded by his brother Ernest le Pelley.

Preceded by Pierre le Pelley II	Seigneur of Sark; 1820–1839	Succeeded by Ernest le Pelley
