= September 2006 Sark electoral system referendum =

A referendum on the composition of the Chief Pleas was held in Sark between 16 August and 6 September 2006, following an informal referendum in February. Voters were given the choice of having all 28 seats elected, or to have 12 seats for Deputies, eight for tenants and eight elected by everyone.

== Background ==
On 8 March 2006 the Chief Pleas voted to reduce the number of seats from 52 to 28. The proposed system at the time was for 14 seats to be reserved for landowners and 14 elected by the general population. However, in April the Seigneur Michael Beaumont warned the Pleas that this may not be approved by the Privy Council. In July three options were put forward; electing all 28 members by universal suffrage; having 16 members elected by the general public and 16 elected by tenants, and having 16 tenants and 16 general members all elected by universal suffrage. A meeting held on 6 July was unable to make a decision due to disagreements on whether to hold a consultative referendum. However, the referendum was agreed to on 9 August.

The Pleas determined that voter turnout must be at least 60% and that a winning option must receive 54.5% of the vote.

== Results ==
Which of the following options for the composition of the Cheaf Pleas would you prefer:

[A] 28 Open Seats

[B] 12 Seats for Deputies, 8 Seats for Tenants, 8 Open Seats

Choice	Votes	%
Option A	234	55.98
Option B	184	44.02
Invalid/blank votes	1	–
Total	419	100
Registered voters/turnout	468	89.52
Source: Direct Democracy
