= Jethou =

Island in Guernsey

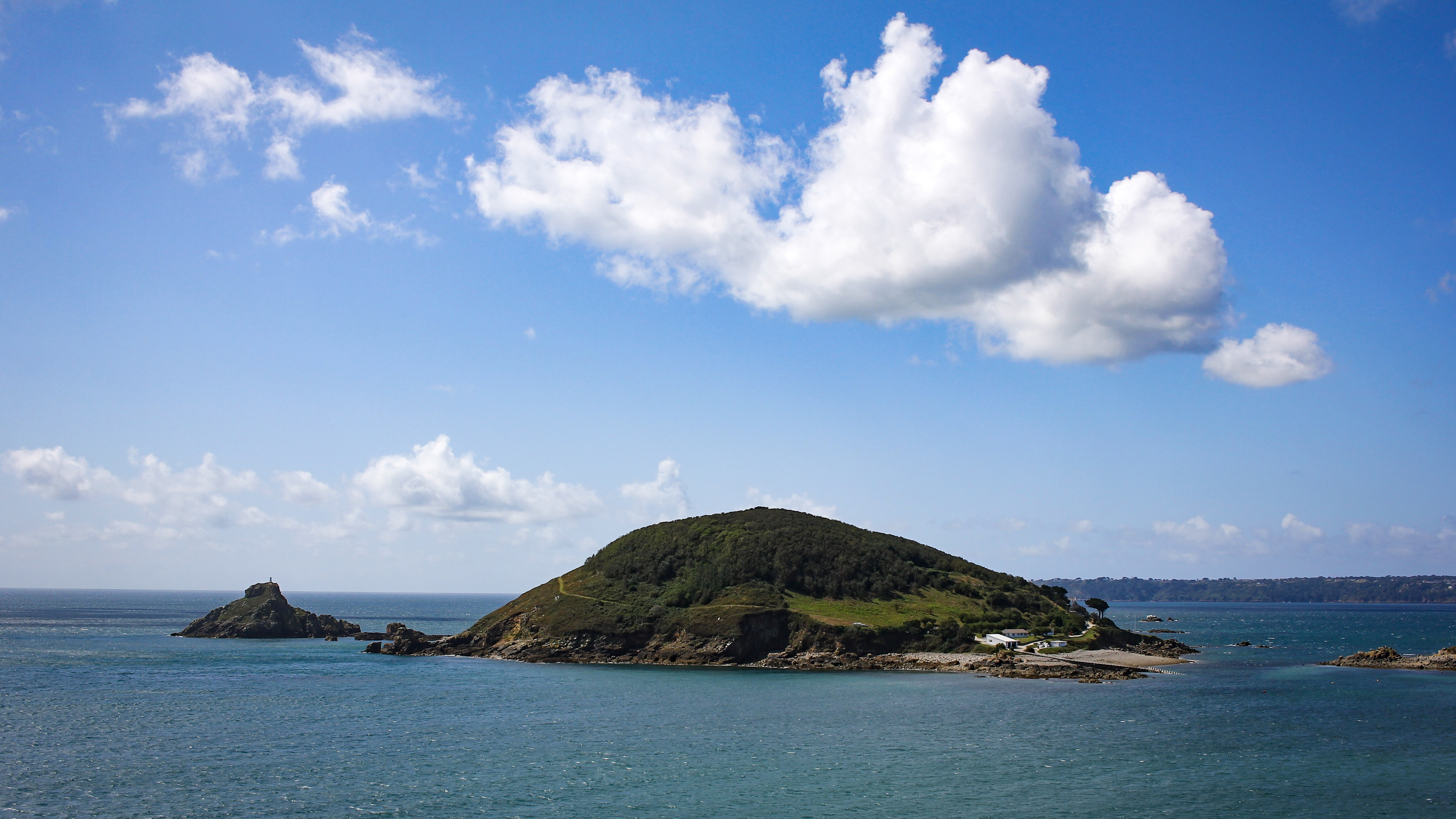
- Jethou as seen from Herm

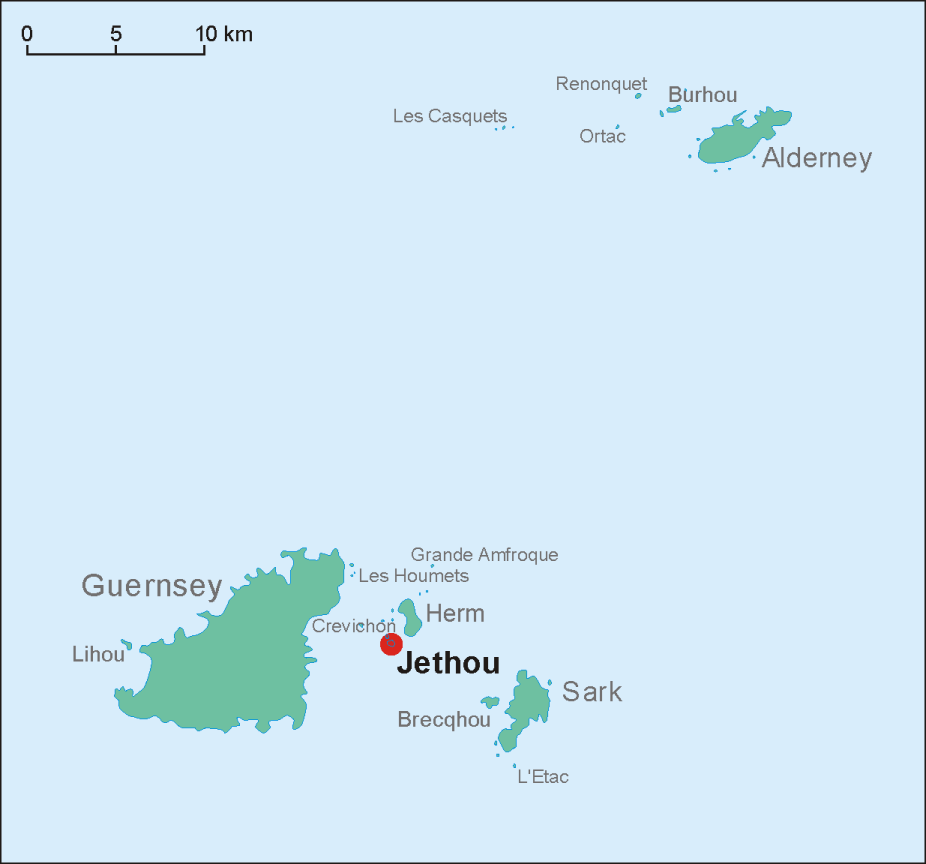
- Location of Jethou (red) in the Bailiwick of Guernsey

Geography
- Coordinates: 49°27′30″N 2°27′45″W
- Archipelago: Channel Islands
- Adjacent to: English Channel
- Area: 44 acres (18 ha)

Administration
- Bailiwick of Guernsey
- Jurisdiction: Guernsey

Demographics
- Population: 3 (1996)

Additional information
- Motto: Vigilare et admonere

Ramsar Wetland
- Official name: Herm, Jethou and The Humps
- Designated: 19 October 2015
- Reference no.: 2277

Jethou

Jethou (/ʒɛˈtuː/ zheh-TOO) is a small island that is part of the Bailiwick of Guernsey in the Channel Islands. It is privately leased from the Crown, and not open to the public. Resembling the top of a wooded knoll, it is immediately southwest of Herm and covers approximately 44 acres (18 ha).

== History ==
There is evidence of flint manufacturing in an area exposed only at low water between the island and Crevichon which shows occupation around 10,000 BC. It is said that in AD 709 a storm washed away the strip of land that connected the island with Herm.

The Vikings called the island Keitholm. The island's current name retains the related Norman -hou suffix, meaning 'small island' or 'small hill'.

In 1416, it became part of Henry V's estate and still remains Crown property, now leased to the States of Guernsey.

On the top is a marker. It is said that in earlier times, pirates were hanged on it with chains, as on nearby Crevichon.

=== Modern history ===
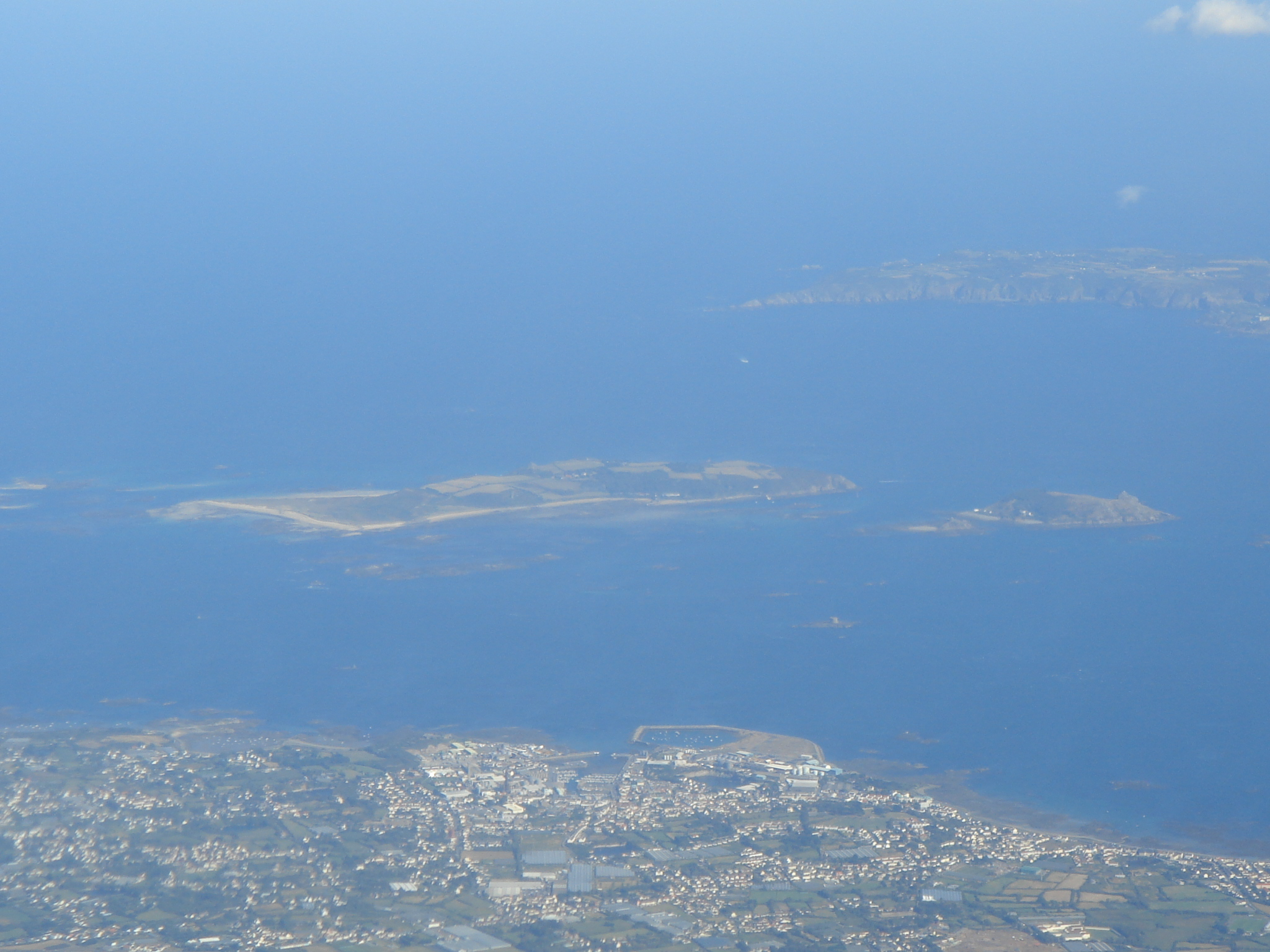
An aerial shot showing Jethou, centre right, next to its bigger neighbour, Herm, with Sark in the background, and the east coast of Guernsey in the foreground.

In 1867, Lt Colonel Montague Fielden became the island's tenant. However, he was discovered using the island as a storehouse for smuggling brandy from France.

From 1920 to 1934, it was leased by the Scottish novelist Compton MacKenzie, along with Herm, and remained part of that estate for years, although it is currently part of a different one.

From September 1964 until December 1971, the island was occupied by the Faed family: Angus Faed, his wife Susan Faed and their four children, Colin, Erik, Colette and Amanda. Mrs Susan Faed was the 22nd tenant of Jethou.

In the 1950s and 60s the island was open to the public. During that period postage stamps were issued. Local stamps on the Bailiwick of Guernsey were banned on 1 October 1969, and the Isle of Jethou was closed to the public from 1970.

In 1972, Charles Hayward, founder of the Firth Cleveland Group of Companies, purchased the Crown tenancy of the island and lived there with his wife Elsie Darnell George until his death in 1983.

In 1996 the island was leased by Sir Peter Ogden of IT company Computacenter.

It was recognised in 2016 as an area of international environmental importance under the Ramsar Convention.

It is flanked by two islets, Crevichon to the north and Fauconnière to the south. There is one house on the island and two cottages, as well as a large garage, where vehicles such as quad bikes and tractors are stored.

== Governance ==
Unlike the largely autonomous islands of Sark and Alderney within the Bailiwick, Jethou is administered entirely by the States of Guernsey. It belonged to the Electoral District of Saint Peter Port South, until the binding 2018 referendum implemented a single, island-wide constituency of which Jethou was a part.

== Wildlife ==
At the back (east) of Jethou, puffins can be seen swimming off the rocks.

== Jethou in popular culture ==
The British 1957 musical Free as Air by Dorothy Reynolds and Julian Slade was set on the minor and fictitious Channel Island of 'Terhou', which was based on Jethou.

Mary Gentle's 2007 novel Ilario: The Stone Golem has a villainous noblewoman exiled to a convent in Jethou.

== See also ==
- List of tenants of Jethou

== Bibliography ==
- BBC Pronouncing Dictionary of British Names (Oxford University Press, 1971) ISBN 978-0194311250
