= Pierre le Pelley I =

Seigneur of Sark

Pierre le Pelley I, Esq., 13th Seigneur of Sark (1736–1778) was Seigneur of Sark from 1752 to 1778.

Pierre le Pelley may have also been known by the anglicized name "Peter", as "Peter le Pelley" the "son of Daniel le Pelley", was reported as the governor of the island of Sark in 1762. His sister Mary Le Pelley was married to William Budd, Esq., also in 1762.

Preceded by Daniel le Pelley	Seigneur of Sark; 1752–1778	Succeeded by Pierre le Pelley II
