= Pierre Carey le Pelley =

Seigneur of Sark

Seigneur of Sark
- Reign: 1849 - 1852
- Predecessor: Ernest le Pelley
- Successor: Marie Collings
- Born: Unknown (mostly likely around 1828)
- Died: Around 1900

Pierre Carey le Pelley was Seigneur of Sark from 1849 to 1852. In 1844, desperate for funds to continue the operation of the silver mine on the island, le Pelley's father Ernest le Pelley had obtained crown permission to mortgage the Fief of Sark for £4,000 to John Allaire, a local privateer. In 1845, the ceiling of the mine's deepest gallery collapsed. The company was uninsured for this, and was finally closed in 1847. Pierre was unable to keep up his mortgage payments and was forced to sell the seigneurie of Sark to Marie Collings, John Allaire's daughter and heiress, for £6,000.

Preceded by Ernest le Pelley	Seigneur of Sark; 1849–1852	Succeeded by Marie Collings
