= David-Henri de Meuron =

Swiss merchant (1742–1825)

David-Henri de Meuron (born 1742 in Neuchâtel; died 1825 in Lisbon) was a Swiss merchant active in colonial trade, banking, and Indienne fabric production in Lisbon.

== Life ==
=== Family ===
David-Henri de Meuron came from the Meuron family and was the son of Abram de Meuron, an innkeeper and member of the Grand Council of the Principality of Neuchâtel (born March 21, 1706, in St. Sulpice; died March 16, 1792, in Neuchâtel), and his wife Madeleine (died November 25, 1775, in Neuchâtel), daughter of Neuchâtel Grand Council member Louis Favarger. He had one sister and one brother.

=== Career ===
Around 1764, David-Henri de Meuron was summoned to Portugal by his uncle, the merchant, banker, and slave trader David de Pury, who imported diamonds and precious woods from the Portuguese colonies in Brazil to Europe. David-Henri de Meuron became a colonial goods merchant and banker in Lisbon and, together with David Schwab from Biel, took over the business of his uncle David de Pury, whose executor he also became. They ran the business under the company name Schwab & Meuron.

David-Henri de Meuron ran one of Lisbon's most important trading houses, operating within an international network in Portugal specializing in colonial trade with Brazil. His connections extended to Switzerland and France, including the company Christoph Burckhardt & Co. in Basel, Bourcard Fils & Cie. in Nantes, and the bank Rougemont von Löwenberg, owned by Denis de Rougemont (1759–1839) in Paris. His economic activities were directly linked to slavery, which remained prevalent in Brazil, particularly on plantations, until 1888. Together with his nephew Edouard de Meuron, Auguste Gouhard from Neuchâtel, and Auguste-Frédéric de Meuron (1789–1852), another relative, he founded the commission business Meuron et Cie. in 1816, contributing 30,000 piastres to its working capital. The company, based in Salvador da Bahia, Brazil, was involved in transporting colonial goods to Europe. Despite its low profitability, it laid the foundation for the career of Auguste-Frédéric de Meuron, later known as Meuron de Bahia, who withdrew from the partnership in 1819 to establish his own business. David-Henri de Meuron never traveled to America during his lifetime.
