= Seigneur of Sark =

Hereditary title in Sark, Channel Islands

- Arms of Sark: Gules, two lions passant guardant in pale or armed and langued azure
- Creation date: 1563; 463 years ago
- Created by: Elizabeth I
- First holder: Hellier de Carteret, 1st Seigneur of Sark
- Present holder: Christopher Beaumont, 23rd Seigneur of Sark
- Heir apparent: Hugh Rees-Beaumont
- Remainder to: heirs and assigns whatsoever
- Status: extant
- Seat: La Seigneurie (traditional)

Flag of Sark

The Seigneur of Sark is the lord of the manor of Sark in the Channel Islands. A female seigneur of Sark is called Dame of Sark, of which there have been three. The husband of a female ruler of Sark is not a consort but is jure uxoris ("by right of (his) wife") a seigneur himself.

== Description ==
The title is hereditary, but with permission of the Crown, it may be mortgaged or sold, as happened in 1849 when Pierre Carey le Pelley sold the fief to Marie Collings for £6,000.

The Seigneur was, before the constitutional reforms of 2008, the head of the feudal government of Sark, with the British monarch being the feudal overlord. The Seigneur had a suspensive veto power and the right to appoint most of the island's officers. Many of the laws, particularly those related to inheritance and the rule of the Seigneur, had changed little since Queen Elizabeth I, by Letters Patent, granted a fiefdom to Hellier de Carteret in 1565.

The residents of Sark voted to introduce a fully elected legislature to replace the feudal government in a 2006 referendum, and the law change was approved on 9 April 2008. The first democratic election was held on 10 December 2008. The changes in the political system mostly apply to the parliament, the Chief Pleas, not to the Seigneur.

Many seigneurs are buried at St. Peter's Anglican Church, Sark.

== List of seigneurs of Sark ==
No.	Portrait	Name (Birth–Death)	Reign	Notes
1		Hellier de Carteret	1563–1578	
2		Philippe de Carteret I (1552–1594)	1578–1594	
3		Philippe de Carteret II (1584–1643)	1594–1643	
4		Philippe de Carteret III (1620–1663/1675)	1643–1663	
5		Philippe de Carteret IV (c. 1650–1693)	1663–1693	
6		Charles de Carteret (1679–1715)	1693–1715	
7		John Carteret (1690–1763)	1715–1720	
8		John Johnson (Died 1723)	1720–1723	
9		James Milner (Died 1730)	1723–1730	
10		Susanne le Pelley (1668–1733)	1730–1733	
11		Nicolas le Pelley (1692–1742)	1733–1742	
12		Daniel le Pelley (1704–1752)	1742–1752	
13		Pierre le Pelley I (1736–1778)	1752–1778	
14		Pierre le Pelley II (1763–1820)	1778–1820	
15		Pierre le Pelley III (1799–1839)	1820–1839	
16		Ernest le Pelley (1801–1849)	1839–1849	
17		Pierre Carey le Pelley	1849–1852	
18		Marie Collings (1791–1853)	1852–1853	
19		William Thomas Collings (1823–1882)	1853–1882	
20		William Frederick Collings (1852–1927)	1882–1927	
21		Sibyl Hathaway (1884–1974)	1927–1974	Reigned under the German occupation from 1940 to 1945.
		Robert Hathaway (1887–1954) (Note: Husband of Sibyl Hathaway.)	1929–1954	Reigned under the German occupation from 1940 to 1945.
22		Michael Beaumont (1927–2016)	1974–2016	
23		Christopher Beaumont (born 1957)	2016–present	

== Heir apparent ==
The heir to the Seigneur of Sark is the person next in line to inherit the island’s hereditary headship, usually the eldest child of the current Seigneur, Christopher Beaumont. The current heir is Hugh Rees-Beaumont, who would take on the role if the Seigneur dies or steps down. The position today is mostly ceremonial, with Sark’s day-to-day governance handled by the Chief Pleas of Sark.
