= Ernest le Pelley =

Seigneur of Sark

Ernest le Pelley, 16th Seigneur of Sark (1801–1849) was the Seigneur of Sark from 1839 to 1849. In 1844, desperate for funds to continue the operation of the silver mine on the island, he obtained crown permission to mortgage the Fief of Sark for £4,000 to John Allaire, a local privateer. In 1845, the ceiling of the mine's deepest gallery collapsed. The company was uninsured for this event, and it was finally closed in 1847. Le Pelley's heir, Pierre Carey le Pelley was unable to keep up his mortgage payments and was forced to sell the seigneurie of Sark to Marie Collings, John Allaire's daughter and heiress, for £6,000.

| Preceded by Pierre le Pelley III | Seigneur of Sark; 1839–1849 | Succeeded by Pierre Carey le Pelley |
