= Nicolas le Pelley =

Seigneur of Sark

Nicolas le Pelley, 11th Seigneur of Sark (1692–1742) was Seigneur of Sark from 1733 to 1742.

Preceded by Susanne le Pelley	Seigneur of Sark; 1733–1742	Succeeded by Daniel le Pelley
