= Daniel le Pelley =

Seigneur of Sark from 1742 to 1752

Daniel le Pelley, Esq. 12th Seigneur of Sark (1704–1752) was Seigneur of Sark from 1742 to 1752. He was also known as the "proprietor of the island of Sark".

Daniel's daughter Mary Le Pelley married William Budd, Esq. in February 1762. His son Peter Le Pelley, Esq. was reported as the governor of the island of Sark in that year.

| Preceded by Nicolas le Pelley | Seigneur of Sark; 1742–1752 | Succeeded by Pierre le Pelley I |
