= American Civil War =

1861–1865 conflict in the United States

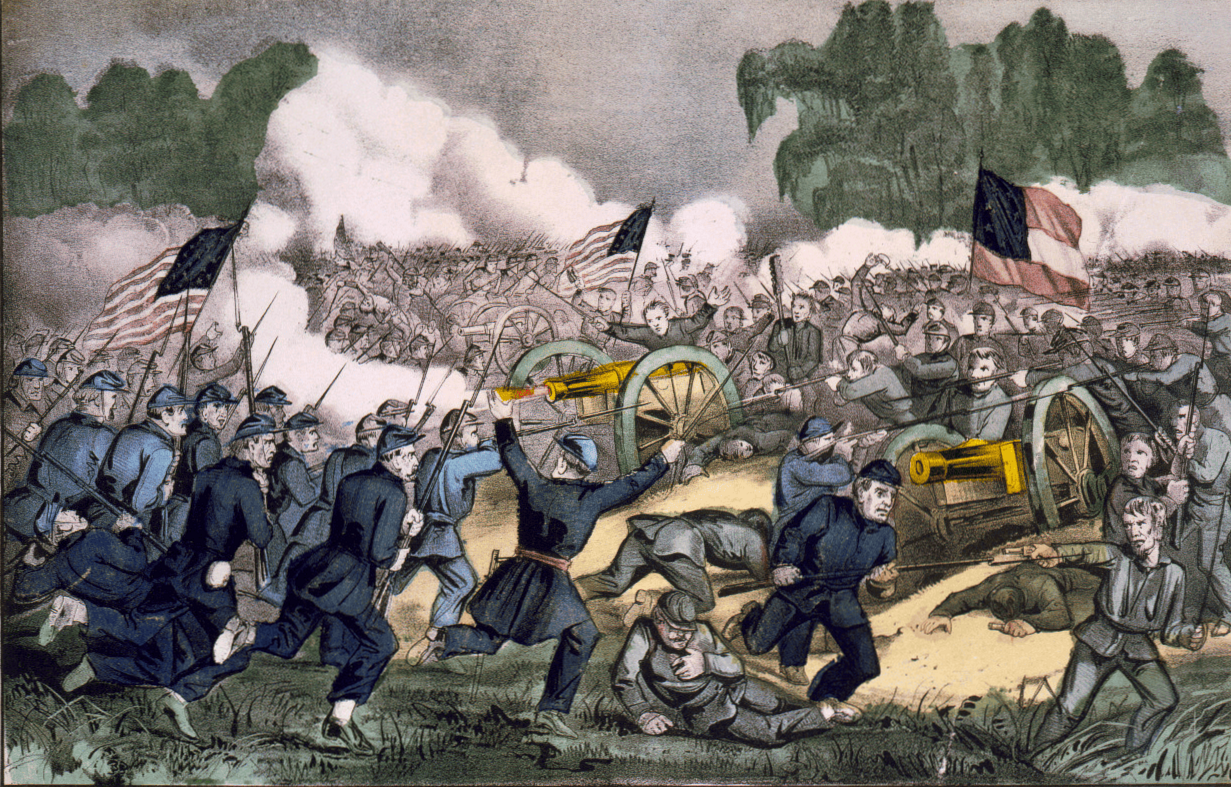
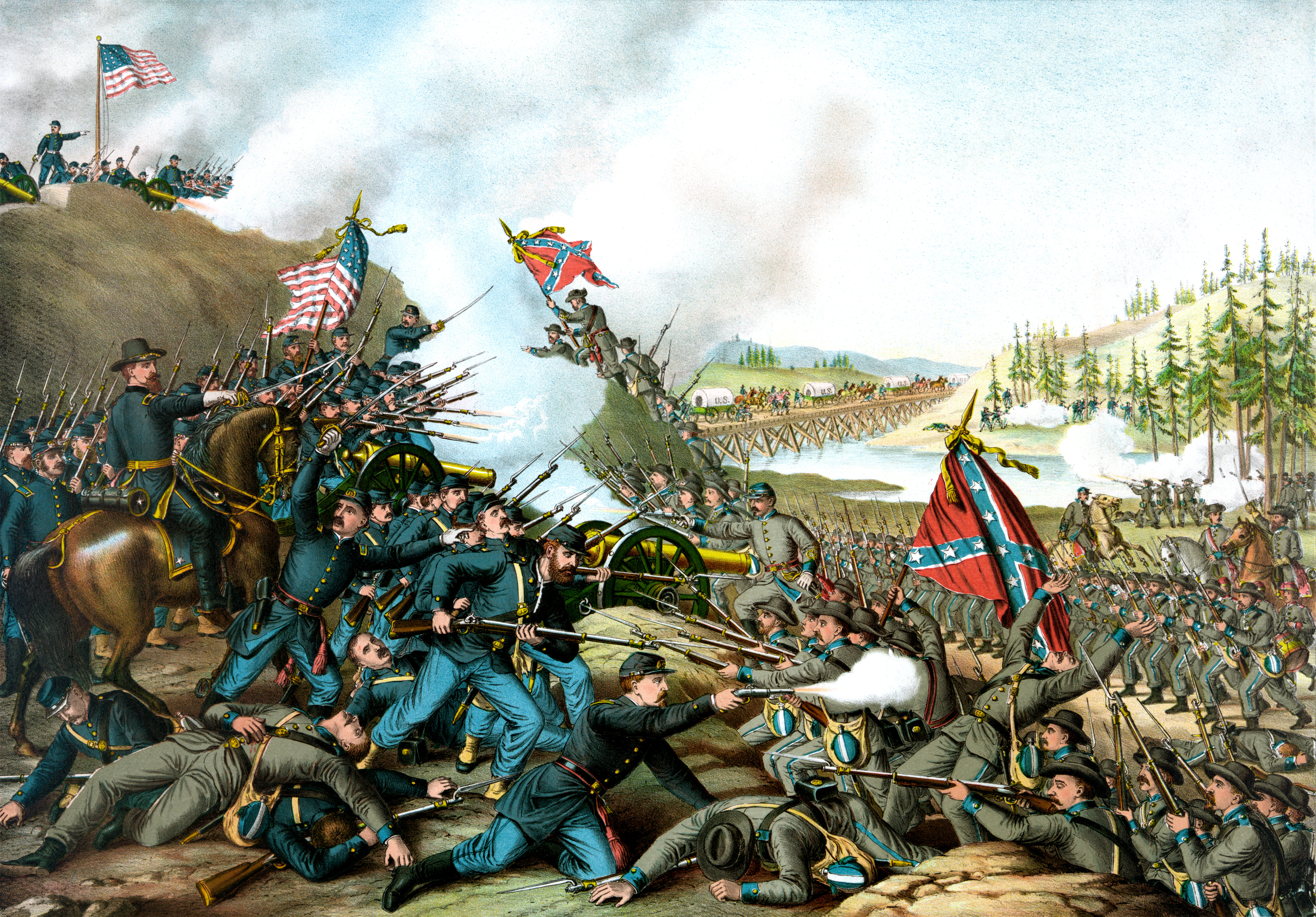
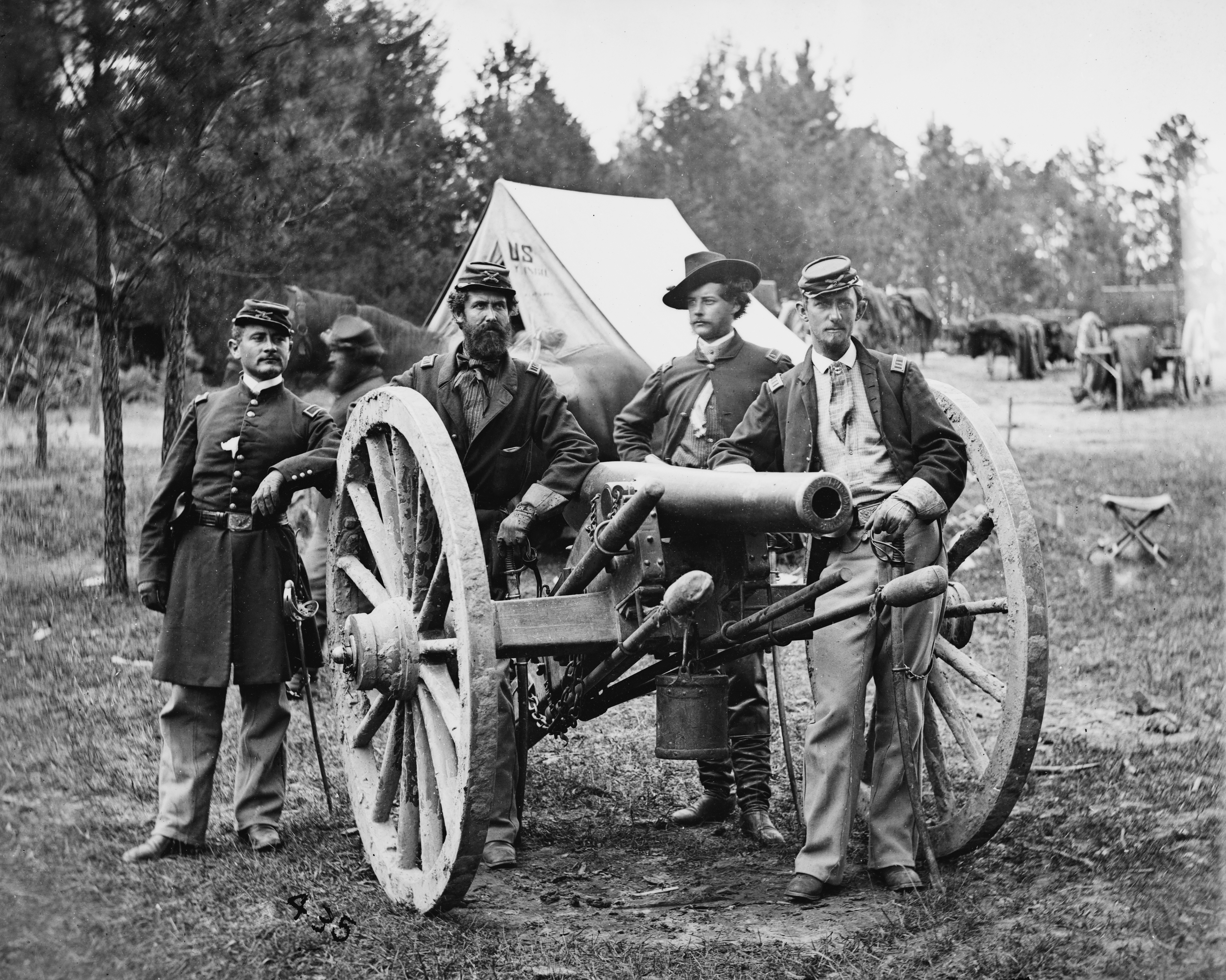
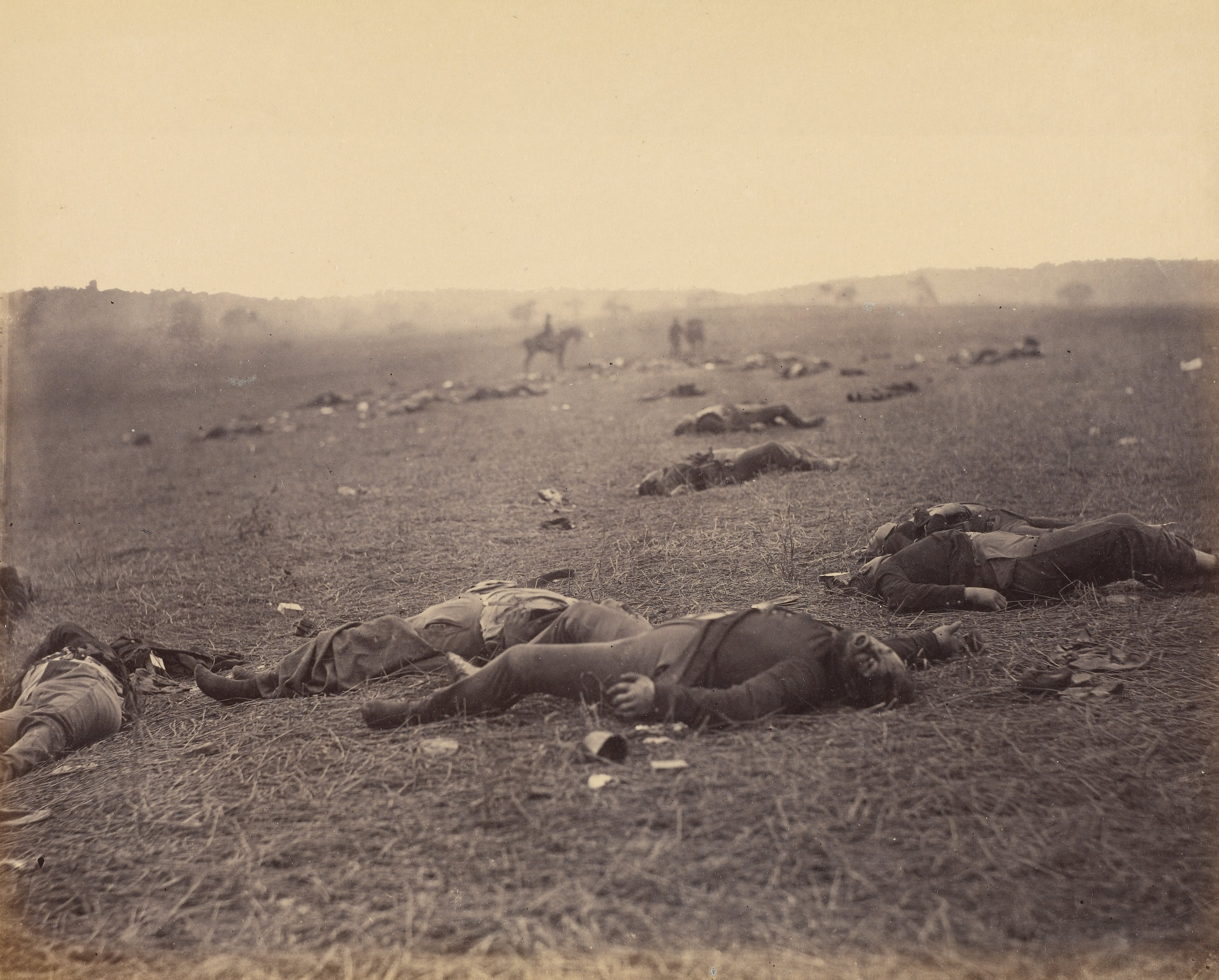
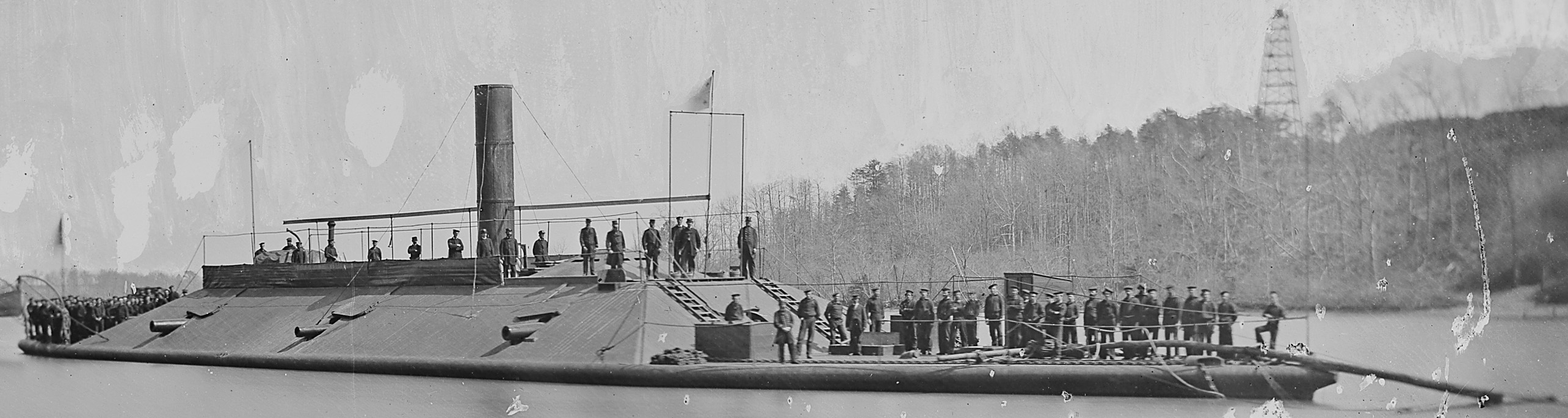
- Battle of Gettysburg Battle of Franklin US Horse Artillery Brigade officers Battle of Antietam A Harvest of Death Ironclad USS Atlanta
Date	April 12, 1861 – May 26, 1865 (Note: "End of the Rebellion; The Last Rebel Army Disbands". The New York Times. United States Department of War. May 29, 1865. Archived from the original on September 15, 2018.; Robertson 1963, p. 31. "Lee's surrender left Johnston with no place to go. On April 26, near Durham, N.C., the Army of Tennessee laid down its arms before Sherman's forces. With the surrender of isolated forces in the Trans-Mississippi West on May 4, 11, and 26, the most costly war in American history came to an end."; Catton 1965, p. 445. "[A]nd on May 26 he [E. Kirby Smith] surrendered and the war was over."; Gallagher et al. 2003, p. 308. "By 26 May, General Edward Kirby Smith had surrendered the Rebel forces in the trans-Mississippi west. The war was over."; Blair 2015, p. 9. "The sheer weight of scholarship has leaned toward portraying the surrenders of the Confederate armies as the end of the war.") (Note: Among the many other contemporary sources and later historians citing May 26, 1865, as the end date for the American Civil War hostilities are George Templeton Strong, who was a prominent New York lawyer; a founder, treasurer, and member of the Executive Committee of United States Sanitary Commission throughout the war; and a diarist. A diary excerpt is published in Gienapp, William E., ed. The Civil War and Reconstruction: A Documentary Collection. New York: W. W. Norton & Co., 2001, pp. 313–314 ISBN 978-0-393-97555-0. A footnote in Gienapp shows that the excerpt was taken from an edited version of the diaries by Allan Nevins and Milton Halsey Thomas, eds., The Diary of George Templeton Strong, vol. 2 (New York: The Macmillan Company), pp. 600–601, which differs from the volume and page numbers of the original diaries; the page in Strong's original handwriting is shown at "Volume 4, pages 124–125: diary entries for May 23 (continued)–June 7, 1865". Archived from the original on November 16, 2022 – via New-York Historical Society Museum & Library.) (4 years, 1 month and 2 weeks)
Location	United States, Atlantic Ocean
Result	Union victory
Territorial changes	Dissolution and reintegration of Confederate States of America into United States of America

Belligerents
United States	Confederate States

Commanders and leaders
(United States) Abraham Lincoln X; (United States) Ulysses S. Grant; (United States) Andrew Johnson; and others...	(Confederate States of America) Jefferson Davis (surrendered) (POW); (Confederate States of America) Robert E. Lee (surrendered); (Confederate States of America) Alexander H. Stephens (surrendered); and others...

Strength
698,000 at peak; 2,200,000 total	360,000 at peak; 750,000–1,000,000 total

Casualties and losses
110,000+ KIA or DOW; 230,000+ died from accidents or disease; 25,000–30,000 died in Confederate prisons; 365,000+ total dead; 282,000+ wounded; 181,193 captured (Note: 211,411 Union soldiers were captured, and 30,218 died in prison. The ones who died have been excluded to prevent double-counting of casualties.); 828,000+ total casualties	94,000+ KIA or DOW; 164,000+ died from accidents or disease; 26,000–31,000 died in Union prisons; 290,000+ total dead; 137,000+ wounded; 436,658 captured (Note: 462,634 Confederate soldiers were captured and 25,976 died in prison. The ones who died have been excluded to prevent double-counting of casualties.); 864,000+ total casualties
- 60,000 identified enslaved people, "tens of thousands" of unidentified enslaved people died from disease; 616,222–1,000,000+ total dead

The American Civil War (April 12, 1861 – May 26, 1865; also known by other names) was fought in the United States between the Union (Note: The Union was the US government and included the states that remained loyal to it, both the non-slave states and the border states (Missouri, Kentucky, Maryland, and Delaware) where slavery was legal. Missouri and Kentucky were also claimed by the Confederacy and given full state delegations in the Confederate States Congress for the duration of the war.) ("the North") and the Confederacy ("the South"), which was formed in 1861 by Southern states that had seceded from the Union to preserve the institution of slavery. The South saw slavery as threatened because of the election of Abraham Lincoln as president in 1860, the abolitionist movement, and the growing electoral power of the North. The war ended with a Union victory, dissolution of the Confederacy and the national abolition of slavery, freeing four million African Americans.

Decades of controversy over slavery came to a head when Abraham Lincoln, a Republican who opposed slavery's expansion into the western territories, won the 1860 presidential election. Seven slave states in the South responded to Lincoln's victory by seceding from the United States and forming the Confederate States. The Confederate States seized United States forts and other federal assets in the South. The war began on April 12, 1861, when the Confederate States bombarded Fort Sumter in South Carolina. A wave of enthusiasm for war swept over the North and South, as military recruitment soared. Four more Southern states seceded after the war began and, led by its president Jefferson Davis, the Confederacy comprised eleven states, containing a third of the US population. Four years of intense combat, mostly in the South, ensued.

During 1861–1862 in the western theater, the Union made permanent gains, capturing New Orleans, the largest city in the South. In the eastern theater the conflict was inconclusive. The abolition of slavery became a Union war goal on January 1, 1863, when Lincoln issued the Emancipation Proclamation, which declared all slaves in rebel states to be free, applying to more than 3.5 million of the 4 million enslaved people in the country. To the west, the Union first destroyed the Confederate river navy by the summer of 1862, then much of its western armies. The successful 1863 Union siege of Vicksburg split the Confederacy in two at the Mississippi River, while Confederate general Robert E. Lee's incursion north failed at the Battle of Gettysburg. Union general Ulysses S. Grant's western successes led Lincoln to promote him to command of all Union armies in 1864.

Coordinating with an ever-tightening naval blockade of Confederate ports, the Union army marshaled resources and the manpower to attack the Confederate States army from all directions. That led to the fall of Atlanta in 1864 to Union general William Tecumseh Sherman, followed by his March to the Sea, which culminated in his taking Savannah. The last significant battles raged around the ten-month siege of Petersburg, gateway to the Confederate capital of Richmond. The Confederates abandoned Richmond, and on April 9, 1865, Lee surrendered to Grant following the Battle of Appomattox Court House, setting in motion the end of the war. (Note: Appomattox is often referred to as the end of the war, although different dates for the war's conclusion have been considered. (See, Vorenberg, Michael. Lincoln's Peace: The Struggle to End the American Civil War. New York: Alfred A. Knopf, 2025.) Lee's surrender to Grant set off a wave of Confederate surrenders. The last military department of the Confederacy, the Trans-Mississippi Department disbanded on May 26.) Lincoln lived to see this victory but was shot by an assassin on April 14, dying the next day.

By the end of the war, much of the South's infrastructure had been destroyed. The Confederacy collapsed, the Thirteenth Amendment abolished slavery (except as punishment for a crime) and four million enslaved black people were freed. The war-torn nation then entered the Reconstruction era in an attempt to rebuild the country, reunite by bringing the former Confederate states back into the United States, and grant civil rights to freed black slaves. The war is one of the most extensively studied and written about episodes in the history of the United States, and it remains the subject of cultural and historiographical debate. Interest continues in the myth of the Lost Cause of the Confederacy. The war was among the first to use industrial warfare. Railroads, the electrical telegraph, steamships, the ironclad warship, and mass-produced weapons were widely used. The war left an estimated 700,000 soldiers dead, along with an undetermined number of civilian deaths, making it the deadliest in U.S. history. (Note: This assumes that Union and Confederate deaths are counted together; more Americans were killed in World War II than in either the Union or Confederate Armies if their death totals are counted separately.)

== Origins ==
The origins of the war were rooted in the desire of the Southern states to preserve the institution of slavery. Historians in the 21st century overwhelmingly agree on the centrality of slavery in the conflict—at least for the Southern states. They disagree, however, on the Union's reasons for refusing to allow the South to secede. The pseudo-historical Lost Cause ideology denies that slavery was the principal cause of the secession, a view disproven by historical evidence, including the seceding states' own secession documents. After leaving the Union, Mississippi issued a declaration stating, "Our position is thoroughly identified with the institution of slavery—the greatest material interest of the world."

The principal political battle leading to Southern secession was over whether slavery would expand into the Western territories destined to become states. Initially, the United States Congress had admitted new states into the Union in each pairs, one slave and one free. This had kept a sectional balance in the Senate but not in the House of Representatives, as free states outstripped slave states in numbers of eligible voters. By mid-19th century, the free-versus-slave status of the new territories was a critical issue, both for the North, where anti-slavery sentiment had grown, and for the South, where the fear of slavery's abolition had grown. Another factor leading to secession and the formation of the Confederacy was the development of white Southern nationalism in the preceding decades. The primary reason for the North to reject secession was to preserve the Union, a cause based on American nationalism.

Background factors in the run-up to the Civil War were partisan politics, abolitionism, nullification versus secession, sectionalism, expansionism, economics, protectionism, and industrialization in the antebellum period. As a panel of historians said in 2011, "while slavery and its various and multifaceted discontents were the primary cause of disunion, it was disunion itself that sparked the war."

=== Lincoln's election ===
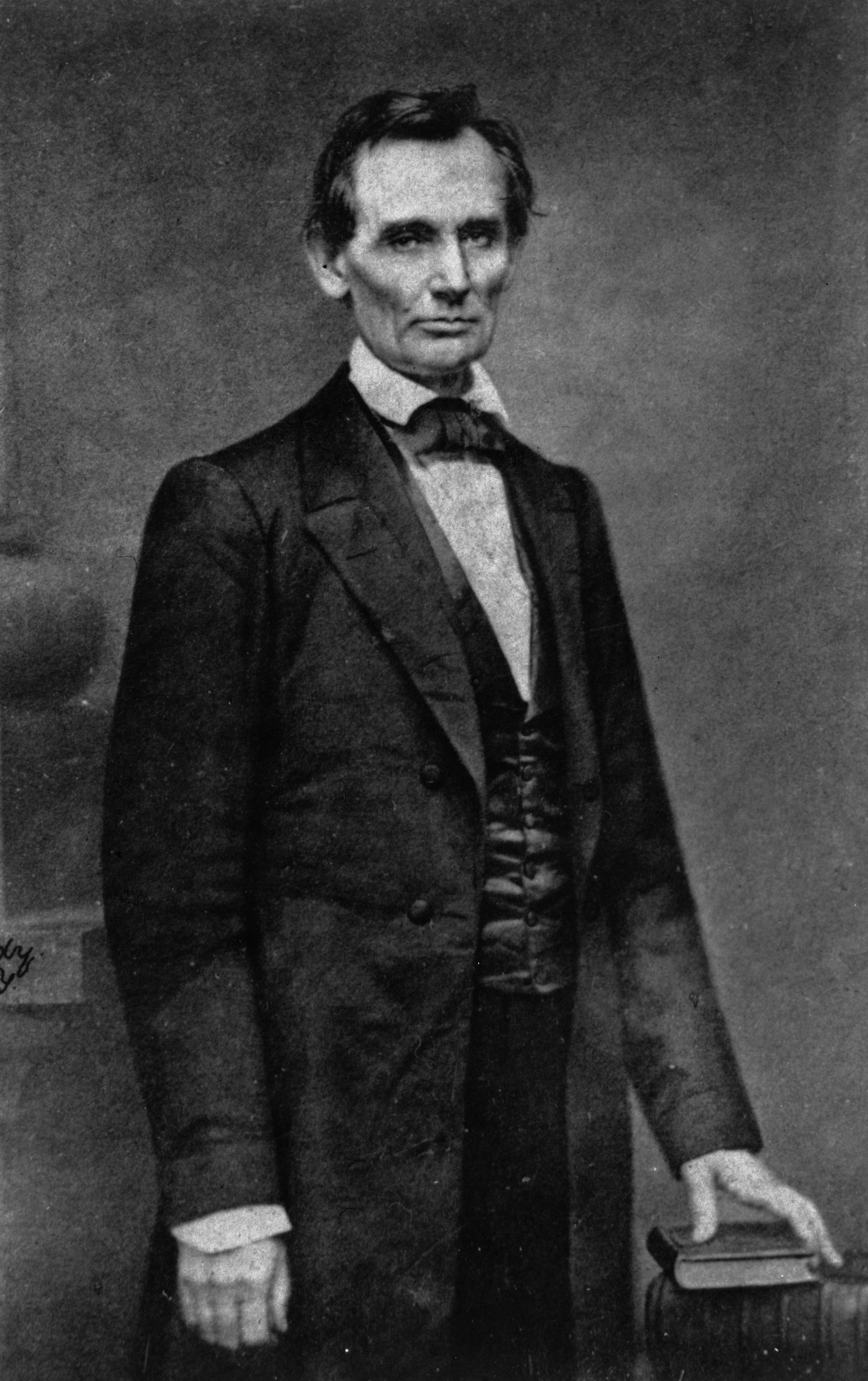
Portrait of Abraham Lincoln, an 1860 photograph portrait of Abraham Lincoln by Mathew Brady

Abraham Lincoln won the 1860 presidential election. Southern leaders feared Lincoln would stop slavery's expansion into the western territories, which would put it on the road to extinction when these territories became free states. His victory triggered declarations of secession by seven slave states of the Deep South, all of whose riverfront or coastal economies were based on cotton that was cultivated by slave labor. A passive response by lame duck President James Buchanan allowed the rebels to seize many federal arsenals and forts.

Lincoln was inaugurated on March 4, 1861, four months after his 1860 election, which afforded the South time to prepare for war. Unionists in the North and South refused to accept the declarations of secession, and no foreign government ever recognized the Confederacy. Under Lincoln, the US government refused to relinquish the remaining forts in the South, which the Confederacy claimed were now in their territory.

According to Lincoln, the American people had demonstrated, beginning with their victory in the American Revolution, the associated American Revolutionary War and subsequent establishment of a sovereign nation, that they could successfully establish and administer a republic. Yet, Lincoln believed, a question remained unanswered: Could the nation be maintained as a republic, with its government selected by vote of the people, in the face of internal attempts to destroy it or separate from it?

== Outbreak of the war ==
=== Secession crisis ===
Status of the states, 1861 Slave states that seceded before April 15, 1861 Slave states that seceded after April 15, 1861 Border Southern states that permitted slavery but did not secede (both KY and MO had dual competing Confederate and Unionist governments) Union states that banned slavery Territories

Lincoln's election had provoked South Carolina's legislature to call a state convention to consider secession. South Carolina had done more than any other state to advance the notion that a state had the right to nullify federal laws and even secede. On December 20, 1860, the convention unanimously voted to secede and adopted a secession declaration. It argued in favor of states' rights for slave owners. However, it also complained about states' rights in the North in the form of resistance to the federal Fugitive Slave Act, claiming that Northern states were not fulfilling their obligations to assist in the return of fugitive slaves. The "cotton states" of Mississippi, Florida, Alabama, Georgia, Louisiana, and Texas followed suit, seceding in January and February 1861.

Division of the states during the American Civil War: Union Confederacy Border states Territories

Among the ordinances of secession, those of Texas, Alabama, and Virginia mentioned the plight of the "slaveholding states" at the hands of Northern abolitionists. The rest made no mention of slavery but were brief announcements by the legislatures of the dissolution of ties to the Union. At least four—South Carolina, Mississippi, Georgia, and Texas—provided detailed reasons for their secession, all blaming the movement to abolish slavery and its influence in the North. Southern states believed that the Fugitive Slave Clause made slaveholding a constitutional right. These states agreed to form a new federal government, the Confederate States of America, on February 4, 1861.

They took control of federal forts and other properties within their boundaries, with little resistance from outgoing president James Buchanan, whose term ended on March 4. Buchanan said the Dred Scott decision was proof the Southern states had no reason to secede and that the Union "was intended to be perpetual". He added that "The power by force of arms to compel a State to remain in the Union" was not among the "enumerated powers granted to Congress". A quarter of the US army—the Texas garrison—was surrendered in February to state forces by its general, David E. Twiggs, who joined the Confederacy.

Referring to the seven Southern states that initially seceded, historian James M. McPherson wrote, "Slaves constituted 47 percent of the population of the Confederate states but only 24 percent in the upper South." He added, "In the four border states the proportion of slaves and slaveowners was less than half what it was in the eleven states that seceded." Eastern Tennessee and western Virginia also had less slavery and showed more support for the Union than the rest of the Confederacy. West Virginia became a new state in 1863, formed from 50 counties of Virginia, citing sectional differences and taxation, though half the counties were secessionist.

Even within Virginia and Tennessee, which had seceded, McPherson wrote, "The voters in 35 Virginia counties with a slave population of only 2.5 percent opposed secession by a margin of three to one, while voters in the remainder of the state, where slaves constituted 36 percent of the population, supported secession by more than ten to one. The thirty counties of east Tennessee that rejected secession by more than two to one contained a slave population of only 8 percent, while the rest of the state, with a slave population of 30 percent, voted for secession by a margin of seven to one."

As Southerners resigned their Senate and House seats, Republicans could pass projects that had been blocked. These included the Morrill Tariff, land grant colleges, a Homestead Act, a transcontinental railroad, the National Bank Act, authorization of United States Notes by the Legal Tender Act of 1862, the end of slavery in the District of Columbia, and a ban on slavery in the territories. The Revenue Act of 1861 introduced an income tax to help finance the war.

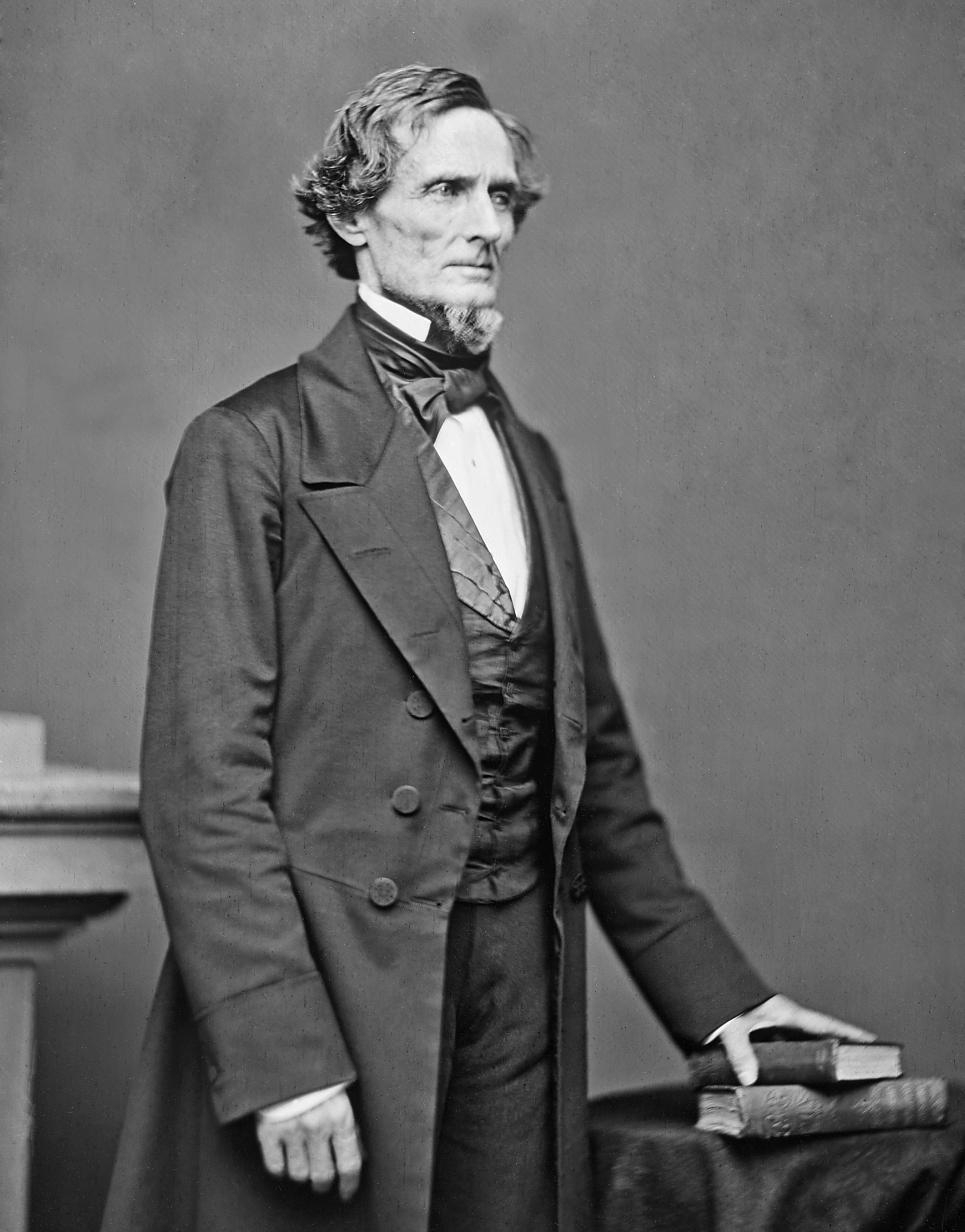
Jefferson Davis, President of the Confederate States of America (1861–1865)

In December 1860, the Crittenden Compromise was proposed to re-establish the Missouri Compromise line, by constitutionally banning slavery in territories to the north of it, while permitting it to the south. The Compromise would likely have prevented secession, but Lincoln and the Republicans rejected it. Lincoln stated that any compromise that would extend slavery would bring down the Union. A February peace conference in Washington proposed a solution similar to the Compromise, but it was rejected by Congress. The Republicans proposed the Corwin Amendment, an alternative, not to interfere with slavery where it existed, but the South regarded it as insufficient. The remaining eight slave states rejected pleas to join the Confederacy, following a no-vote in Virginia's First Secessionist Convention on April 4.

On March 4, Lincoln was sworn in as president. In his first inaugural address, he argued that the Constitution was established to form a more perfect union than existed under the earlier Articles of Confederation and Perpetual Union, was a binding contract, and that secession was "legally void". He did not intend to invade Southern states, nor to end slavery where it existed, but he said he would use force to maintain possession of federal property, including forts, arsenals, mints, and customhouses that had been seized. "The mails, unless repelled, will continue to be furnished in all parts of the Union." Where conditions did not allow peaceful enforcement of federal law, US marshals and judges would be withdrawn. No mention was made of bullion lost from mints. He stated that it would be US policy "to collect the duties and imposts"; "there will be no invasion, no using of force against or among the people anywhere" that would justify an armed revolution. His speech closed with a plea for restoration of the bonds of union, famously calling on "the mystic chords of memory" binding the two regions.

The Confederacy sent delegates to Washington to negotiate a peace treaty. Lincoln rejected negotiations, because he claimed that the Confederacy was not a legitimate government and to make a treaty with it would recognize it as such. Lincoln instead attempted to negotiate directly with the governors of seceded states, whose administrations he continued to recognize.

Complicating Lincoln's attempts to defuse the crisis was Secretary of State William H. Seward, who had been Lincoln's rival for the Republican nomination. Embittered by his defeat, Seward agreed to support Lincoln's candidacy only after he was guaranteed the executive office then considered the second most powerful. In the early stages of Lincoln's presidency Seward held little regard for him, due to his perceived inexperience. Seward viewed himself as the de facto head of government, the "prime minister" behind the throne. Seward attempted to engage in unauthorized and indirect negotiations that failed. Lincoln was determined to hold all remaining Union-occupied forts in the seceded states: Fort Pickens, Fort Jefferson, and Fort Taylor in Florida, and Fort Sumter in South Carolina.

=== Battle of Fort Sumter ===
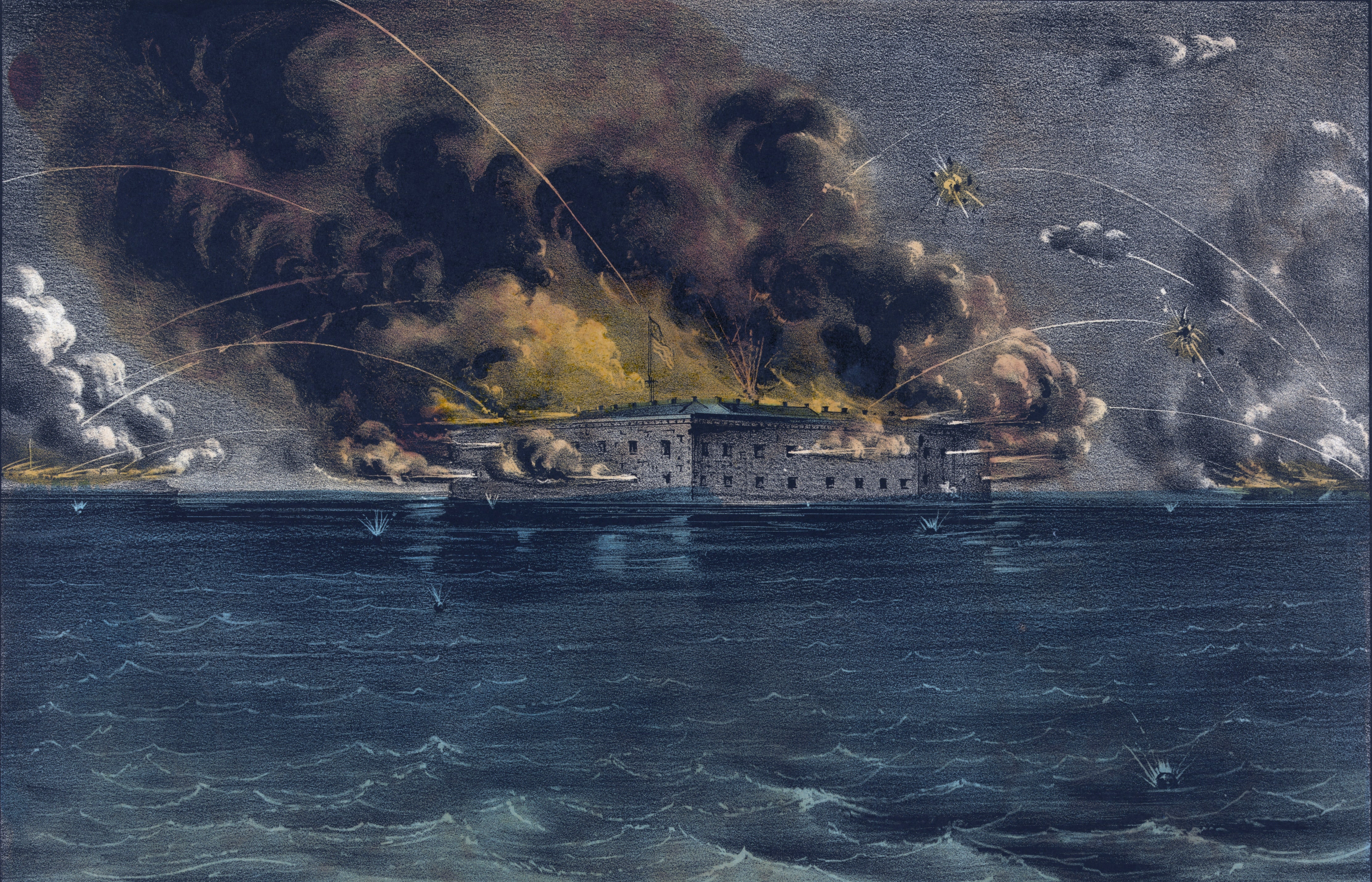
The Battle of Fort Sumter, as depicted by Currier and Ives

The American Civil War began on April 12, 1861, when Confederate forces opened fire on the Union-held Fort Sumter, which is in the Charleston, South Carolina harbor. Its status had been contentious for months. Outgoing president Buchanan had dithered in reinforcing its garrison, commanded by Major Robert Anderson. Anderson took matters into his own hands and on December 26, 1860, under the cover of darkness, sailed the garrison from the poorly placed Fort Moultrie to the stalwart island Fort Sumter. Anderson's actions made him a hero in the North. An attempt to resupply the fort on January 9, 1861, failed and nearly incited a war, but an informal truce held. On March 5, Lincoln was informed that the fort was low on supplies.

Fort Sumter proved a key challenge to Lincoln's administration. Back-channel dealing by Seward with the Confederates undermined Lincoln's decision-making; Seward wanted to pull out. But a firm hand by Lincoln tamed Seward, who was a staunch Lincoln ally thereafter. Lincoln decided holding the fort, which would require reinforcing it, was the only workable option. On April 6, Lincoln informed the governor of South Carolina that a ship with food but no ammunition would attempt to supply the fort. Richard N. Current wrote:

In short, it appears that Lincoln, when he decided to send the Sumter expedition, considered hostilities to be probable. It also appears, however, that he believed an unopposed and peaceable provisioning to be at least barely possible.... He thought hostilities would be the likely result, and he was determined that, if they should be, they must clearly be initiated by the Confederates. "To say that Lincoln meant that the first shot would be fired by the other side if a first shot was fired, ... is not to say that he maneuvered to have the first shot fired."

James McPherson describes this win-win approach as "the first sign of the mastery that would mark Lincoln's presidency"; the Union would win if it could resupply and hold the fort, and the South would be the aggressor if it opened fire on an unarmed ship supplying starving men. An April 9 Confederate cabinet meeting resulted in Davis ordering General P. G. T. Beauregard to take the fort before supplies reached it.

At 4:30 a.m. on April 12, Confederate forces fired the first of 4,000 shells at the fort; it fell the next day. The loss of Fort Sumter lit a patriotic fire under the North. On April 15, Lincoln called on the states to field 75,000 militiamen for 90 days; impassioned Union states met the quotas quickly. On May 3, 1861, Lincoln called for an additional 42,000 volunteers for three years. Shortly after this, Virginia, Tennessee, Arkansas, and North Carolina seceded and joined the Confederacy. To reward Virginia, the Confederate capital was moved to Richmond.

=== Attitude of the border states ===
US secession map, showing the Union and the Confederacy Union states Union territories not permitting slavery Southern Border Union states, permitting slavery (One of these states, West Virginia, was created in 1863, while KY, WV and MO had dual competing Confederate and Unionist governments) Confederate states Union territories that permitted slavery (claimed by Confederacy) at the start of the war, but where slavery was outlawed by the US in 1862

Maryland, Delaware, Missouri, and Kentucky, known as the border states, were slave states that had not seceded and whose people had divided loyalties to the North and South, with some men enlisting in the Union Army and others in the Confederate Army. West Virginia may be compared to the border states because it had slavery after it separated from Virginia and was admitted to the Union on June 20, 1863, but it was admitted under a plan of gradual emancipation known as the Willey Amendment.

Maryland's territory surrounded Washington, D.C., and could cut it off from the North. It had anti-Lincoln officials who tolerated anti-army rioting in Baltimore and the burning of bridges, both aimed at hindering the passage of troops to Washington, D.C., and the South. Maryland's legislature voted overwhelmingly to stay in the Union, but rejected hostilities with its southern neighbors, voting to close Maryland's rail lines to prevent their use for war. Lincoln responded by establishing martial law and suspending habeas corpus in Maryland, along with sending in militia units.

In Ex parte Merryman, Chief Justice Roger Taney found that only Congress could suspend habeas corpus, but Lincoln ignored his ruling. Lincoln took control of Maryland and the District of Columbia by seizing prominent figures, including arresting one-third of the members of the Maryland General Assembly, who were pro-Confederate, on September 17, 1861, the day it intended to reconvene. All were held without trial at Fort McHenry in Baltimore.

In September 1861, federal troops imprisoned a Baltimore newspaper editor, Frank Key Howard, after he criticized Lincoln in an editorial for ignoring Chief Justice Taney's ruling in Ex parte Merryman. Howard wrote a book about his prison experiences, which was published early in 1863. It "stressed the crowded conditions and spartan hardships of prison life ... [and] likened the conditions in Fort Lafayette to those on 'a slave-ship, on the middle passage'".

In Missouri, an elected convention on secession voted to remain in the Union. When pro-Confederate Governor Claiborne Fox Jackson called out the state militia, it was attacked by federal forces under General Nathaniel Lyon, who chased the governor and rest of the State Guard to the southwestern corner of Missouri (see Missouri secession). Early in the war the Confederacy controlled southern Missouri through the Confederate government of Missouri but was driven out after 1862. In the resulting vacuum, the convention on secession reconvened and took power as the Unionist provisional government of Missouri.

Kentucky did not secede but declared itself neutral. When Confederate forces entered in September 1861, its neutrality ended and the state reaffirmed its Union status while maintaining slavery. During an invasion by Confederate forces in 1861, Confederate sympathizers and delegates from 68 Kentucky counties organized the secession Russellville Convention, formed the shadow Confederate Government of Kentucky, inaugurated a governor, and Kentucky was admitted into the Confederacy on December 10, 1861. Its jurisdiction extended only as far as Confederate battle lines in the Commonwealth, which at its greatest extent was over half the state, and it went into exile after October 1862.

After Virginia's secession, a Unionist government in Wheeling asked 48 counties to vote on an ordinance to create a new state in October 1861. A voter turnout of 34 percent approved the statehood bill, with 96 percent approving. Twenty-four secessionist counties were included in the new state, and the ensuing guerrilla war engaged about 40,000 federal troops for much of the war. Congress admitted West Virginia to the Union on June 20, 1863. West Virginians provided about 20,000 soldiers to each side in the war. A Unionist secession attempt occurred in East Tennessee but was suppressed by the Confederacy, which arrested over 3,000 men suspected of loyalty to the Union; they were held without trial.

== War ==
The Civil War was marked by intense and frequent battles. Over four years, 237 named battles were fought, along with many smaller actions, often characterized by their bitter intensity and high casualties. Historian John Keegan described it as "one of the most ferocious wars ever fought", where in many cases the only target was the enemy's soldiers.

=== Mobilization ===
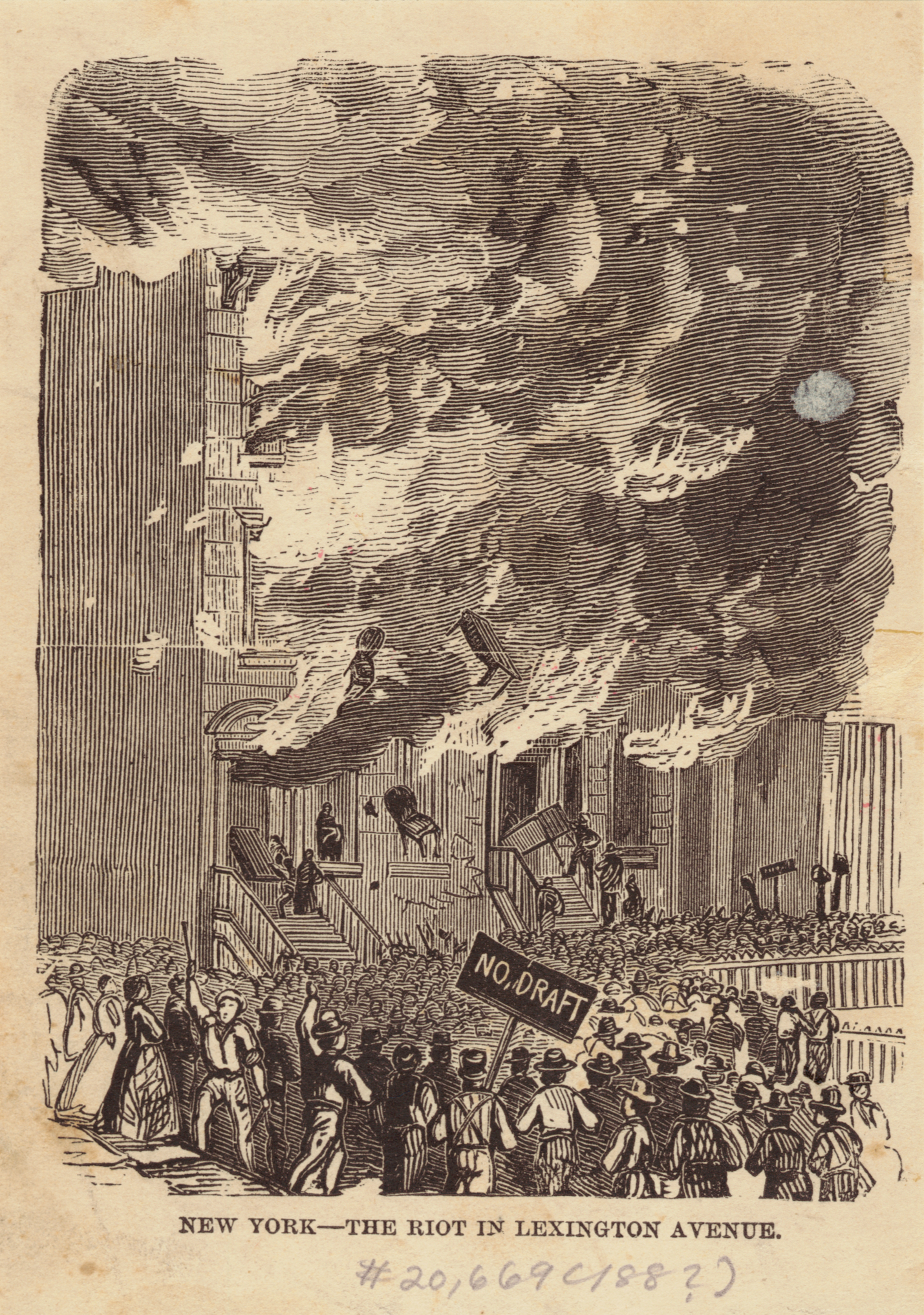
Rioters attacking a building during the 1863 New York anti-draft riots

As the Confederate states organized, the US Army numbered 16,000, while Northern governors began mobilizing their militias. The Confederate Congress authorized up to 100,000 troops in February. By May, Jefferson Davis was pushing for another 100,000 soldiers for one year or the duration, and the US Congress responded in kind.

In the first year of the war, both sides had more volunteers than they could effectively train and equip. After the initial enthusiasm faded, relying on young men who came of age each year was not enough. Both sides enacted draft laws (conscription) to encourage or force volunteering, though relatively few were drafted. The Confederacy passed a draft law in April 1862 for men aged 18 to 35, with exemptions for overseers, government officials, and clergymen. The US Congress followed in July, authorizing a militia draft within states that could not meet their quota with volunteers. European immigrants joined the Union Army in large numbers, including 177,000 born in Germany and 144,000 in Ireland. About 50,000 Canadians served, around 2,500 of whom were black.

When the Emancipation Proclamation went into effect in January 1863, ex-slaves were energetically recruited to meet state quotas. States and local communities offered higher cash bonuses for white volunteers. Congress tightened the draft law in March 1863. Men selected in the draft could provide substitutes or, until mid-1864, pay commutation money. Many eligibles pooled their money to cover the cost of anyone drafted. Families used the substitute provision to select which man should go into the army and which should stay home.

There was much evasion and resistance to the draft, especially in Catholic areas. The New York City draft riots in July 1863 involved Irish immigrants who had been signed up as citizens to swell the vote of the city's Democratic political machine, not realizing it made them liable for the draft. Of the 168,649 men procured for the Union through the draft, 117,986 were substitutes, leaving only 50,663 who were conscripted.

In the North and South, draft laws were highly unpopular. In the North, some 120,000 men evaded conscription, many fleeing to Canada, and another 280,000 soldiers deserted during the war. At least 100,000 Southerners deserted, about 10 percent of the total. Southern desertion was high because many soldiers were more concerned about the fate of their local area than the Southern cause. In the North, "bounty jumpers" enlisted to collect the generous bonus, deserted, then re-enlisted under a different name for a second bonus; 141 were caught and executed.

From a tiny frontier force in 1860, the Union and Confederate armies grew into the "largest and most efficient armies in the world" within a few years. Some European observers at the time dismissed them as amateur and unprofessional, but historian John Keegan concluded that each outmatched the French, Prussian, and Russian armies, and without the Atlantic, could have threatened any of them with defeat.

=== Southern Unionists ===
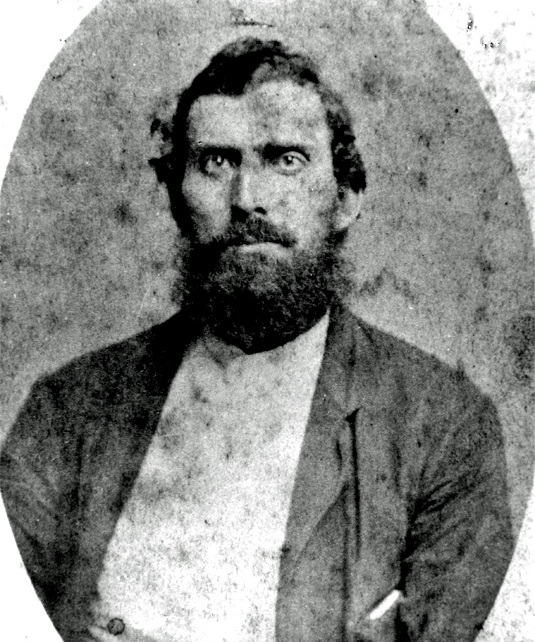
Newton Knight, one of the founders of the Free State of Jones

Unionism was strong in certain areas within the Confederacy. As many as 100,000 men living in states under Confederate control served in the Union Army or pro-Union guerrilla groups. Although they came from all classes, most Southern Unionists differed socially, culturally, and economically from their region's dominant prewar, slave-owning planter class.

=== Prisoners ===
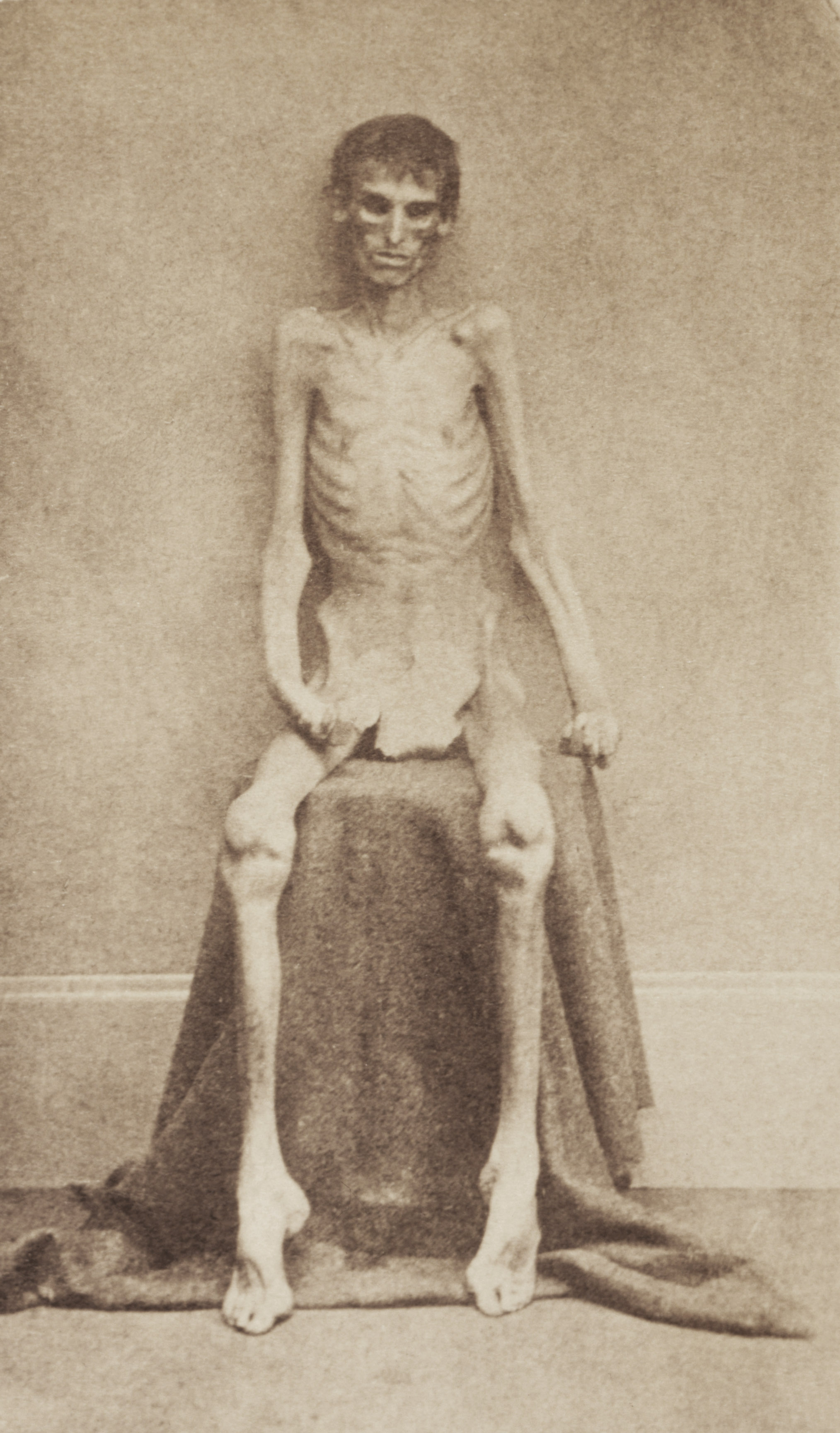
A Union soldier held as a POW

At the beginning of the Civil War, a parole system operated, under which captives agreed not to fight until exchanged. They were held in camps run by their army, paid, but not allowed to perform any military duties.

The system of exchanges collapsed in 1863 when the Confederacy refused to exchange black prisoners. After that, approximately 56,000 of the 409,000 POWs died in prisons, accounting for 10 percent of the conflict's fatalities.

=== Women ===
Historian Elizabeth D. Leonard writes that between 500 and 1,000 women enlisted as soldiers on both sides, disguised as men. Women also served as spies, resistance activists, nurses, and hospital personnel. Women served on the Union hospital ship Red Rover and nursed Union and Confederate troops at field hospitals. Mary Edwards Walker, the only woman ever to receive the Medal of Honor, served in the Union Army and was given the medal for treating the wounded during the war. One woman, Jennie Hodgers, fought for the Union under the name Albert D. J. Cashier. After she returned to civilian life, she continued to live as a man until she died in 1915 at the age of 71.

==== Union ====
During the war, women in the North advocated for social reforms and created ladies' aid societies, also called soldiers' aid societies, which provided supplies to soldiers on the battlefield and cared for sick and wounded soldiers. Women in the North also held military rallies, village parades, and charity bazaars.

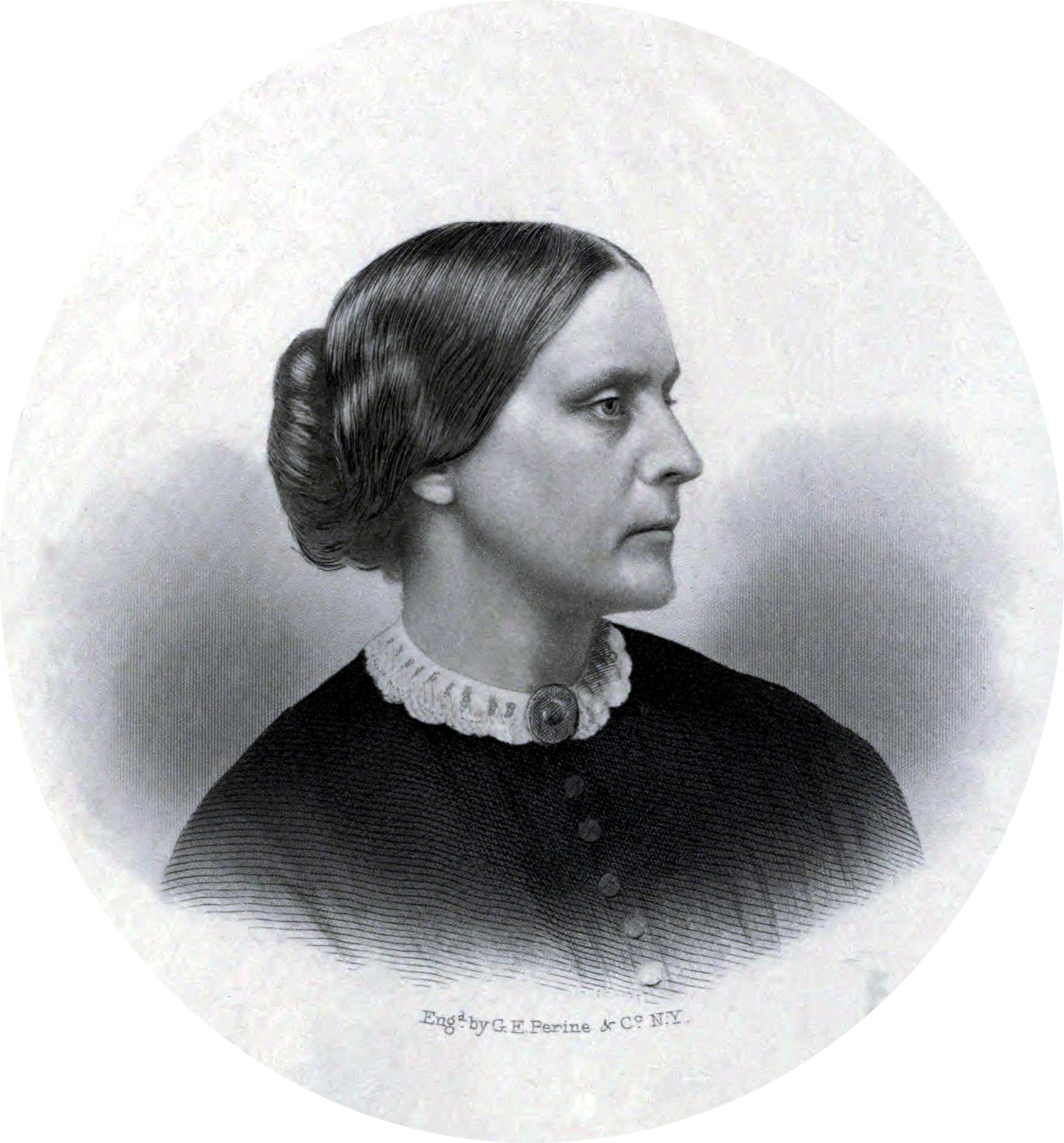
Susan B. Anthony was a women's rights activist and abolitionist.

Women like Susan B. Anthony saw that supporting the war effort was a way to pave the future for women's suffrage movements. In her appeal to Northern women's loyalty, Anthony challenged the inconsistencies of the nation's founding ideal and its actual practices concerning equality among women.

Northern women during the Civil War also made great strides in the workforce, as they helped contribute to the war effort by stepping into roles that were traditionally held by men. While women rarely worked in factories before the war, many filled men's places as they felt they could erase some of the boundaries that separated them from male preserves of power. Women were important in the workforce as they prepared and packed provisions, sewed uniforms and havelocks, and knitted socks and mittens. By entering these new environments, women made significant progress in the fight for women's equality in the workforce.

Northern women were also essential in the wartime support, as they were active participants in the war narrative. While women were not allowed to fight on the battlefield in the Civil War, they exhibited a patriotism that gave them the strength to maintain courage for themselves as well as their households. While their men were off at war, Northern women created a landscape that emphasized love, sacrifice, and the nurturing of men's courage. This is demonstrated in feminized war literature that encouraged, expressed, and valorized men's patriotism. Women's unwavering encouragement and affection towards fighting men became a cornerstone of the war effort as it helped sustain the spirits of the men on the frontlines.

==== Confederate ====
Confederate women during the Civil War focused on preserving the central economic institution of the Old South: the plantation. With so many men away at war, women were left with the land and the slaves. While some women hired male overseers to assist them in directing and maintaining newly female-headed plantations, other women decided to stay at the plantations and run the plantations themselves. Southern women became focused on keeping the economic structure of the South as they dealt with increasingly rebellious slaves.

The South relied on enslaved labor because it was an agrarian economy. A good number of enslaved men labored for the Confederate army during the war, which meant that enslaved women and children were increasingly at the center of the work force on the plantations.

White Southern women struggled to maintain morale on the home front as they dealt with problems without men. Although Southern women were devoted to the Confederacy, many requested that their sons and husbands be discharged from the military to help them at home. Eliza Adams wrote to the Confederate government to appeal for exemptions for her sons' military service, as she had sent five sons and also sons-in-laws to fight for the Confederacy. Southern women were torn between their patriotic ideals and their daily realities of life on the home front.

=== Union navy ===
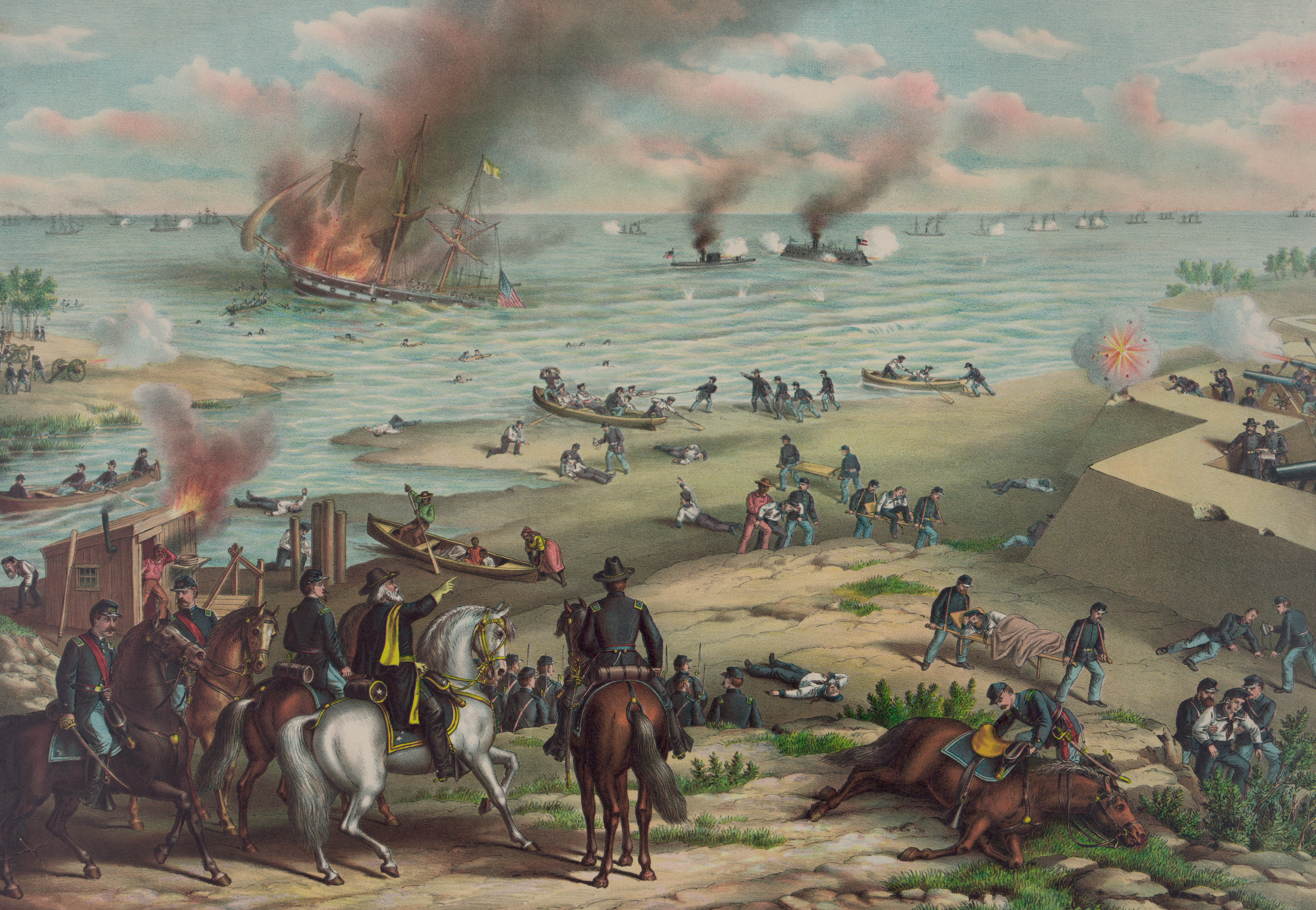
Battle between the USS Monitor and Merrimack

The Union navy in 1861 was relatively small but, by 1865, expanded rapidly to 6,000 officers, 45,000 sailors, and 671 vessels totaling 510,396 tons. Its mission was to blockade Confederate ports, control the river system, defend against Confederate raiders on the high seas, and be ready for a possible war with the British Royal Navy. The main riverine war was fought in the West, where major rivers gave access to the Confederate heartland. The US Navy eventually controlled the Red, Tennessee, Cumberland, Mississippi, and Ohio rivers. In the East, the Navy shelled Confederate forts and supported coastal army operations.

The Civil War occurred during the early stages of the industrial revolution, leading to naval innovations, including the ironclad warship. The Confederacy, recognizing the need to counter the Union's naval superiority, built or converted over 130 vessels, including 26 ironclads. Despite these efforts, Confederate ships were largely unsuccessful against Union ironclads. The Union navy used timberclads, tinclads, and armored gunboats. Shipyards in Cairo, Illinois, and St. Louis built or modified steamboats.

The Confederacy experimented with the submarine CSS Hunley, which proved unsuccessful, and with the ironclad CSS Virginia, rebuilt from the sunken Union ship Merrimack. On March 8, 1862, Virginia inflicted significant damage on the Union's wooden fleet, but the next day, the first Union ironclad, USS Monitor, arrived to challenge it in the Chesapeake Bay. The resulting three-hour Battle of Hampton Roads was a draw, proving ironclads were effective warships. The Confederacy scuttled the Virginia to prevent its capture, while the Union built many copies of the Monitor. The Confederacy's efforts to obtain warships from Great Britain failed, as Britain had no interest in selling warships to a nation at war with a stronger enemy and feared souring relations with the US.

=== Union blockade ===
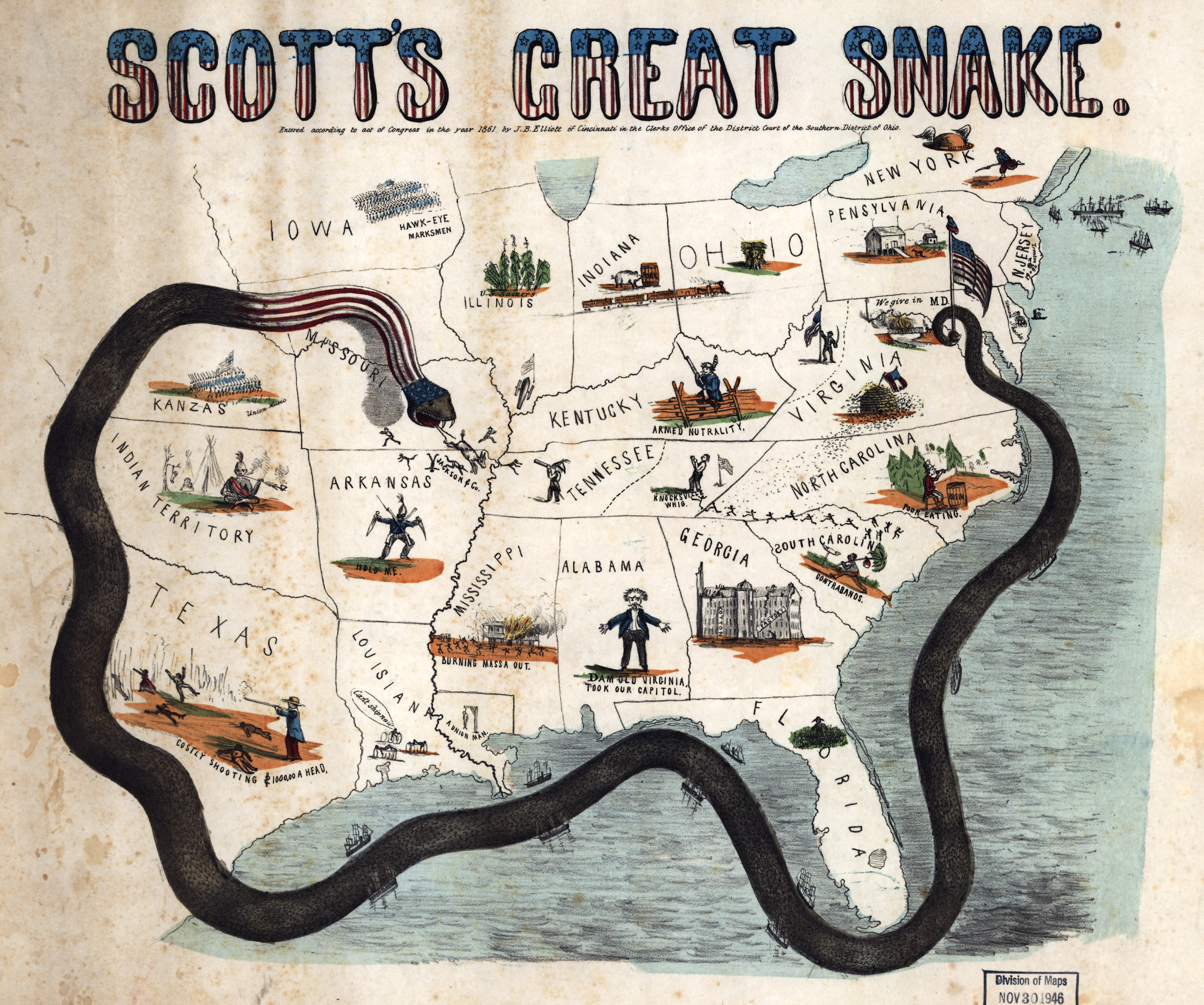
General Scott's Anaconda Plan, featuring a tightening naval blockade, forcing rebels out of Missouri along the Mississippi River, Kentucky Unionists sit on the fence, idled cotton industry illustrated in Georgia.

By early 1861, General Winfield Scott had devised the Anaconda Plan to win the war with minimal bloodshed, calling for a blockade of the Confederacy to suffocate the South into surrender. Lincoln adopted parts of the plan but opted for a more active war strategy. In April 1861, Lincoln announced a blockade of all Southern ports. Commercial ships could not get insurance, ending regular traffic.

The South blundered by embargoing cotton exports before the blockade was fully effective. By the time they reversed this decision, it was too late. "King Cotton" was dead, as the South could export less than 10% of its cotton. The blockade shut down the ten Confederate seaports with railheads that moved almost all the cotton. By June 1861, warships were stationed off the principal Southern ports, and a year later nearly 300 ships were in service.

==== Blockade runners ====
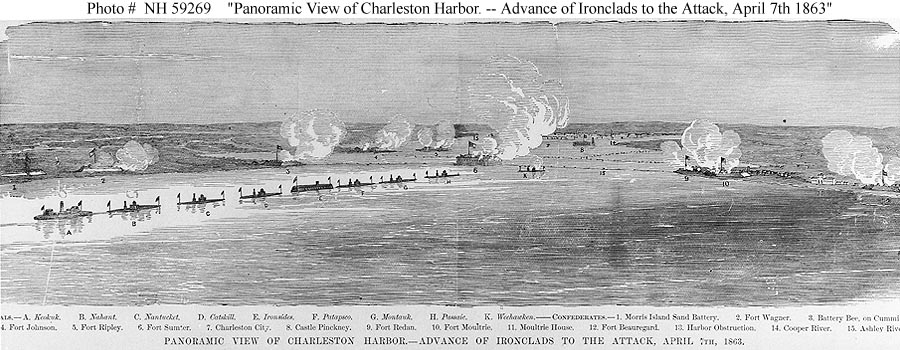
A gunline of nine Union ironclads. The South Atlantic Blockading Squadron off Charleston. A continuous blockade of all major ports was sustained by the North's overwhelming war production.

The Confederates began the war short on military supplies, which the agrarian South could not produce in adequate numbers. Northern arms manufacturers were restricted by an embargo, ending existing and future contracts with the South. The Confederacy turned to foreign sources, connecting with financiers and companies like S. Isaac, Campbell & Company and the London Armoury Company in Britain, becoming the Confederacy's main source of arms.

To transport arms safely to the Confederacy, British investors built small, fast, steam-driven blockade runners that traded arms and supplies from Britain, through Bermuda, Cuba, and the Bahamas in exchange for high-priced cotton. Many were lightweight and designed for speed, only carrying small amounts of cotton back to England. When the Union Navy seized a blockade runner, the ship and cargo were condemned as a prize of war and sold, with proceeds given to the Navy sailors; the captured crewmen, mostly British, were released.

==== Economic impact ====
The Southern economy nearly collapsed during the war due to multiple factors, the most notable being severe food shortages, failing railroads, loss of control over key rivers, foraging by Northern armies, and the seizure of animals and crops by Confederate forces. Historians agree the blockade was a major factor in ruining the Confederate economy; however, Wise argues blockade runners provided enough of a lifeline to allow General Robert E. Lee to continue fighting for additional months, as a result of supplies that included 400,000 rifles, lead, blankets, and boots that the Confederate economy could no longer supply.

The Confederate cotton crop became nearly useless, which cut off the Confederacy's primary source of income. Critical imports were scarce, and coastal trade also largely ended. The blockade's success was not measured by the few ships, which slipped through, but by the thousands that never tried. European merchant ships could not obtain insurance for their ships and transport, and were too slow to evade the blockade, leading them to cease docking in Confederate ports.

To fight an offensive war, the Confederacy purchased arms in Britain and converted British-built ships into commerce raiders, which targeted United States Merchant Marine ships in the Atlantic and Pacific oceans. The Confederacy smuggled 600,000 arms, enabling it to continue fighting for two more years. As insurance rates soared, American-flagged ships largely ceased traveling in international waters, though some were reflagged with European flags, which allowed them to continue operating. After the conclusion of the Civil War, the US government demanded Britain reimburse it for the damage caused by blockade runners and raiders outfitted in British ports. Britain paid the US$15 million in 1871, which covered costs associated with commerce raiding but nothing more.

=== Diplomacy ===
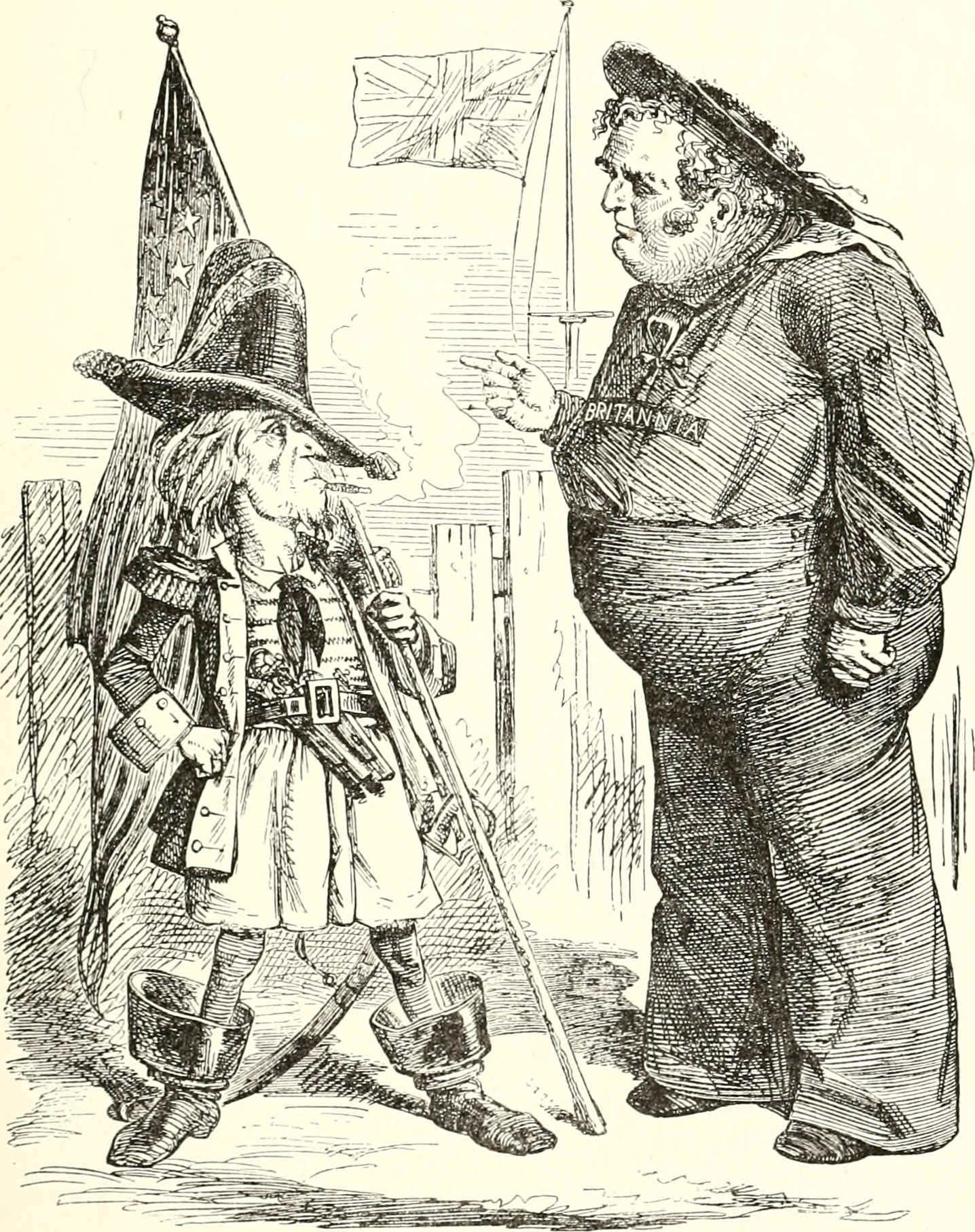
A December 1861 cartoon in Punch magazine in London ridicules US aggressiveness in the Trent Affair. John Bull, at right, warns Uncle Sam, at left, "You do what's right, my son, or I'll blow you out of the water."

Although the Confederate States of America had hoped Britain and France would join them against the Union, this was never likely, so they sought to bring them in as mediators. The Union worked to block this and threatened war against any country that recognized the Confederacy. In 1861, Southerners voluntarily embargoed cotton shipments, hoping to start an economic depression in Europe that would force Britain to enter the war, but this failed. Worse, Europe turned to Egypt and India for cotton, which they found superior, hindering the South's postwar recovery.

Cotton diplomacy proved a failure, because Europe had a surplus of cotton, while the 1860–62 crop failures in Europe made the North's grain exports critically important. It also helped turn European opinion against the Confederate States. It was said that "King Corn was more powerful than King Cotton", as US grain increased from a quarter to almost half of British imports. Meanwhile, the war created jobs for arms makers, ironworkers, and ships to transport weapons.

Lincoln's administration initially struggled to appeal to European public opinion. At first, diplomats explained that the US was not committed to ending slavery and emphasized legal arguments about the unconstitutionality of secession. Confederate representatives, however, focused on their struggle for liberty, commitment to free trade, and the essential role of cotton in the European economy. The European aristocracy was "absolutely gleeful in pronouncing the American debacle as proof that the entire experiment in popular government had failed. European government leaders welcomed the fragmentation of the ascendant American Republic."

A European public with liberal sensibilities remained, which the US sought to appeal to by building connections with the international press. By 1861, Union diplomats like Carl Schurz realized emphasizing the war against slavery was the Union's most effective moral asset in swaying European public opinion. Seward was concerned an overly radical case for reunification would distress European merchants with cotton interests; even so, he supported a widespread campaign of public diplomacy.

US minister to Britain Charles Francis Adams proved adept and convinced Britain not to challenge the Union blockade. The Confederacy purchased warships from commercial shipbuilders in Britain, with the most famous being the CSS Alabama, which caused considerable damage and led to serious postwar disputes. However, public opinion against slavery in Britain created a political liability for politicians, where the anti-slavery movement was powerful.

War loomed in late 1861 between the US and UK over the Trent Affair, which began when US Navy personnel boarded the British ship Trent and seized two Confederate diplomats. However, London and Washington smoothed this over after Lincoln released the two men. Prince Albert left his deathbed to issue diplomatic instructions to Lord Lyons during the Trent Affair. His request was honored, and, as a result, the British response to the US was toned down, helping avert war. In 1862, the British government considered mediating between the Union and Confederacy, though such an offer would have risked war with the US. British prime minister Lord Palmerston reportedly read Uncle Tom's Cabin three times when deciding what his decision would be.

The Union victory at the Battle of Antietam caused the British to delay this decision. The Emancipation Proclamation increased the political liability of supporting the Confederacy. Realizing that Washington could not intervene in Mexico as long as the Confederacy controlled Texas, France invaded Mexico in 1861 and installed the Habsburg Austrian archduke Maximilian I as emperor. Washington repeatedly protested France's violation of the Monroe Doctrine. Despite sympathy for the Confederacy, France's seizure of Mexico deterred it from war with the Union. Confederate offers late in the war to end slavery in return for diplomatic recognition were not seriously considered by London or Paris. After 1863, the Polish revolt against Russia further distracted the European powers and ensured they remained neutral.

Russia supported the Union, largely because it believed the US counterbalanced its geopolitical rival, the UK. In 1863, the Imperial Russian Navy's Baltic and Pacific fleets wintered in the American ports of New York and San Francisco, respectively.

== Eastern theater ==
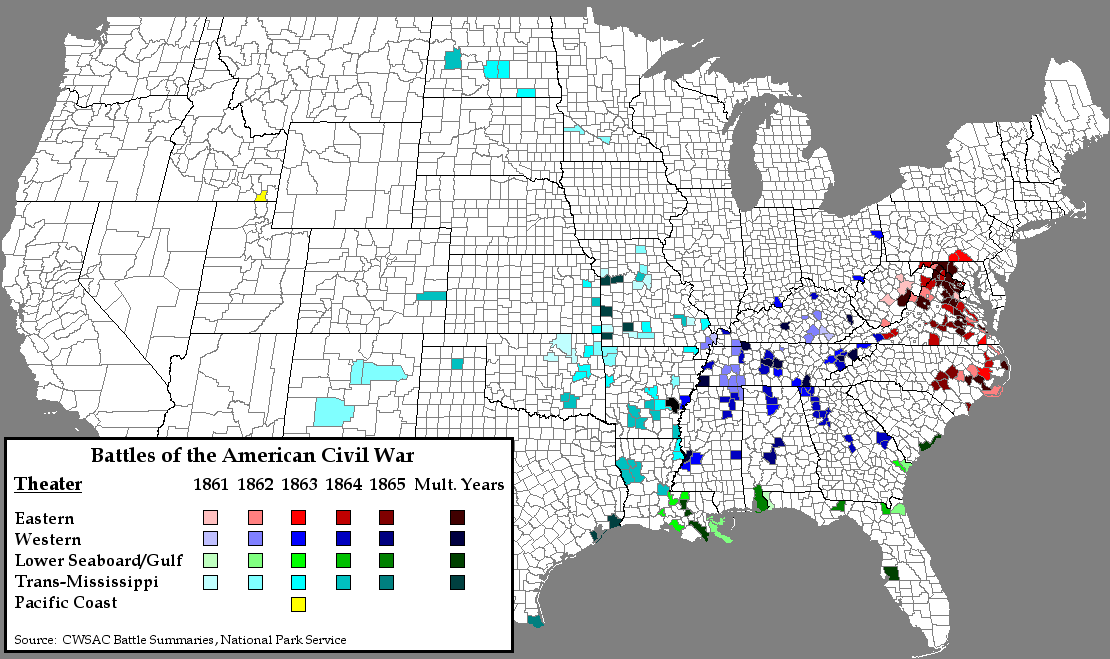
A county map of Civil War battles by theater and year

The eastern theater refers to the military operations east of the Appalachian Mountains, including Virginia, West Virginia, Maryland, and Pennsylvania, the District of Columbia, and the coastal fortifications and seaports of North Carolina.

=== Background ===
==== Army of the Potomac ====
Maj. Gen. George B. McClellan took command of the Union Army of the Potomac on July 26, 1861. The 1862 Union strategy called for simultaneous advances along four axes:

1. McClellan would lead the main thrust in Virginia towards Richmond.
2. Ohio forces would advance through Kentucky into Tennessee.
3. The Missouri Department would drive south along the Mississippi River.
4. The westernmost attack would originate from Kansas.

==== Army of Northern Virginia ====
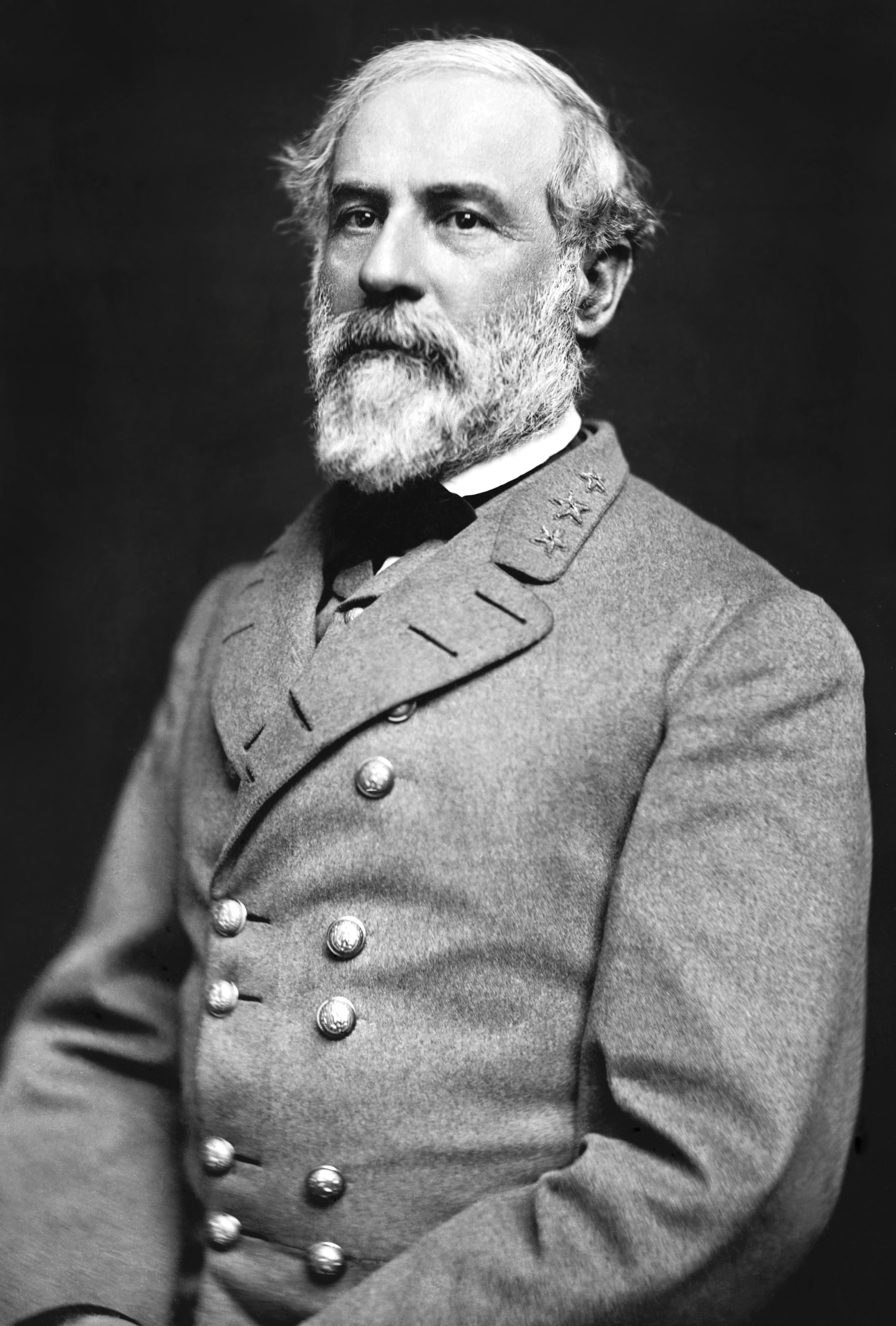
Robert E. Lee, the overall commander of the Confederate States Army

The primary Confederate force in the eastern theater was the Army of Northern Virginia. The Army originated as the (Confederate) Army of the Potomac, which was organized on June 20, 1861, from all operational forces in Northern Virginia. On July 20 and 21, the Army of the Shenandoah and forces from the District of Harpers Ferry were added. Units from the Army of the Northwest were merged into the Army of the Potomac between March 14 and May 17, 1862. The Army of the Potomac was renamed Army of Northern Virginia on March 14. The Army of the Peninsula was merged into it on April 12, 1862.

When Virginia declared its secession in April 1861, Robert E. Lee chose to follow his home state, despite his desire for the country to remain intact and an offer of a senior Union command. In his four-volume biography of Lee published in 1934 and 1935, historian Douglas S. Freeman wrote that the army received its final name from Lee when he issued orders assuming command on June 1, 1862. Lee corresponded with Brigadier General Joseph E. Johnston, his predecessor in army command, before that date and referred to Johnston's command as the Army of Northern Virginia.

Part of the confusion results from the fact that Johnston commanded the Department of Northern Virginia as of October 22, 1861, and the name Army of Northern Virginia was seen as an informal consequence of its parent department's name. Jefferson Davis and Johnston did not adopt the name, but the organization of units as of March 14 was clearly the same organization that Lee received on June 1, and is generally referred to as the Army of Northern Virginia, even if that is correct only in retrospect.

On July 4 at Harper's Ferry, Colonel Thomas J. Jackson assigned Jeb Stuart command of all cavalry companies of the Army of the Shenandoah, and Jackson eventually commanded the Army of Northern Virginia's cavalry.

=== Battles ===
A portrait depicting the Battle of Antietam, which resulted in over 22,000 casualties, the Civil War's deadliest one-day battle

Called the "Philippi Races" because of its brevity, Philippi, Virginia, now Philippi, WV, was the scene of the first organized land action of the American Civil War, on June 3, 1861. In July 1861, in the first in a series of prominent battles in the war, Union Army troops commanded by Maj. Gen. Irvin McDowell attacked Confederate forces, which were under the command of Beauregard near the national capital in Washington. The Confederacy repelled the attack in the First Battle of Bull Run. At the beginning of the battle, the Union appeared to hold the upper hand. The Union Army routed Confederate forces, then holding defensive positions.

Confederate reinforcements under Joseph E. Johnston arrived from the Shenandoah Valley by railroad, and the battle's course quickly changed. A brigade of Virginians, commanded by Thomas J. Jackson, then a relatively unknown brigadier general from Virginia Military Institute, stood its ground, leading to Jackson earning the nickname "Stonewall". Lincoln urged the Union Army to commence offensive operations against Confederate forces, which led General George B. McClellan, in the spring of 1862, to attack Virginia by way of the peninsula between the York River and James River southeast of Richmond. McClellan's army reached the gates of Richmond in the Peninsula campaign.

Also in the spring of 1862, in Shenandoah Valley, Jackson led his Valley Campaign, during which he employed rapid and unpredictable movements on interior lines. Jackson's 17,000 troops marched 646 miles (1,040 km) in 48 days, during which they won minor battles as they engaged three Union armies, comprising 52,000 men, including those of Nathaniel P. Banks and John C. Frémont, preventing them from reinforcing the Union offensive against Richmond. The swiftness of Jackson's troops earned them the nickname foot cavalry. Johnston halted McClellan's advance at the Battle of Seven Pines, but he was wounded in the battle, and Robert E. Lee assumed his position of command. Lee and his senior subordinates, James Longstreet and Stonewall Jackson, defeated McClellan in the Seven Days Battles, forcing McClellan's retreat.

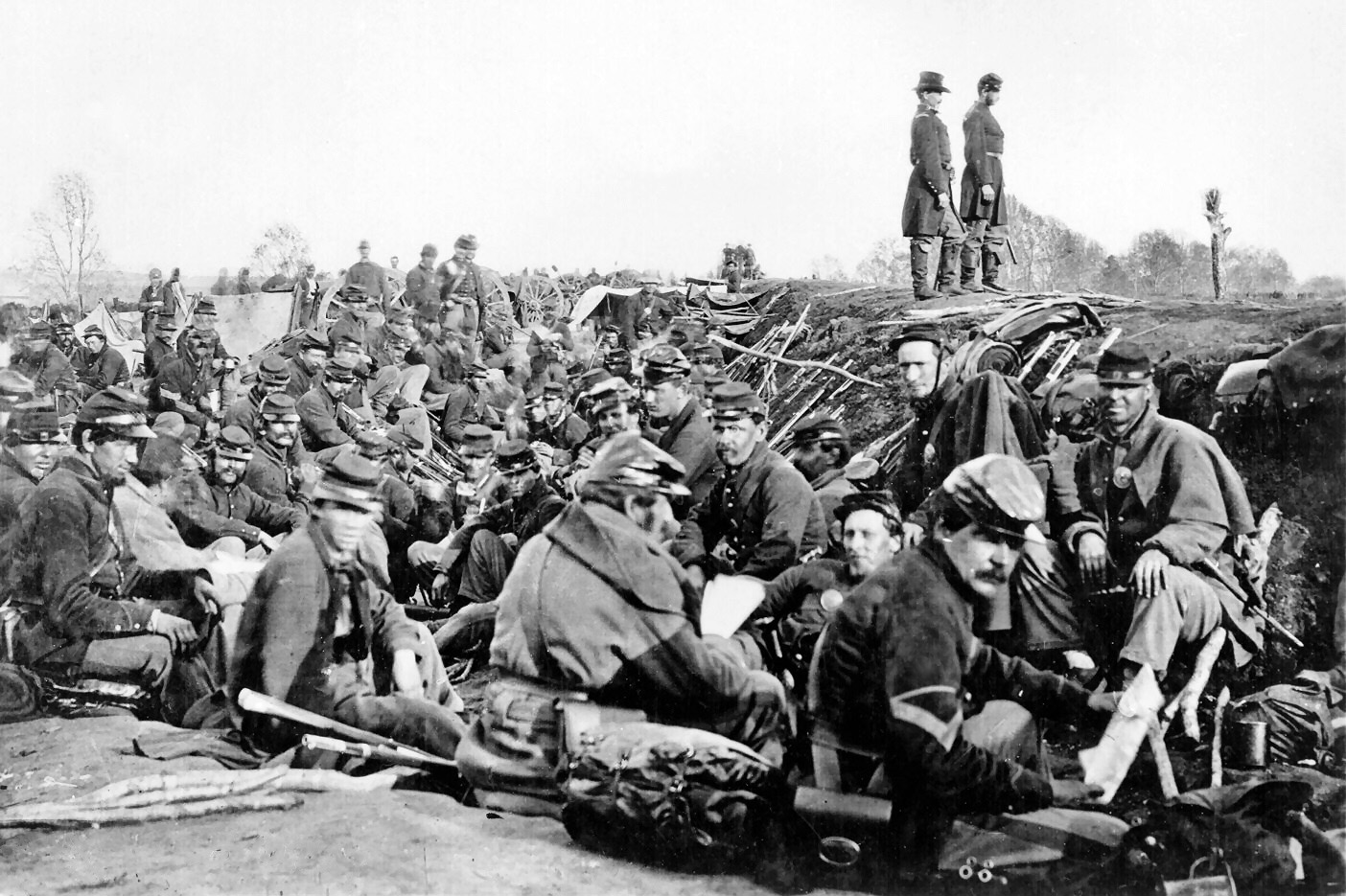
Union soldiers in the trenches, just prior to the Second Battle of Fredericksburg in May 1863

During the Northern Virginia Campaign, which included the Second Battle of Bull Run, Confederate forces registered another important military victory. McClellan resisted General-in-Chief Halleck's orders to send reinforcements to John Pope's Union Army of Virginia, which enabled Lee's Confederate forces to defeat twice the number of combined enemy troops.

Emboldened by Second Bull Run, Confederate forces launched their first invasion of the North in the Maryland Campaign during which Lee led 45,000 Army of Northern Virginia troops across the Potomac River into Maryland on September 5. Lincoln then restored Pope's troops to McClellan. McClellan and Lee clashed in the Battle of Antietam near Sharpsburg, Maryland, on September 17, 1862, which was the bloodiest single day in both the Civil War and US military history. Lee's army retreated to Virginia before McClellan could destroy it, leading the Battle of Antietam to be widely viewed as a Union victory since it halted Lee's invasion of the North and provided an opportunity for Lincoln to issue the Emancipation Proclamation, which he issued as an executive order on January 1, 1863.

McClellan failed to respond in any measurable way to Lee's attempt to invade the North at Antietam, leading to his replacement by Maj. Gen. Ambrose Burnside. Burnside led Union Army troops in the Battle of Fredericksburg, where they were defeated on December 13, 1862. Over 12,000 Union soldiers were killed or wounded during futile attempts by Union troops to launch frontal assaults against Marye's Heights. After the battle, Burnside was replaced by Maj. Gen. Joseph Hooker.

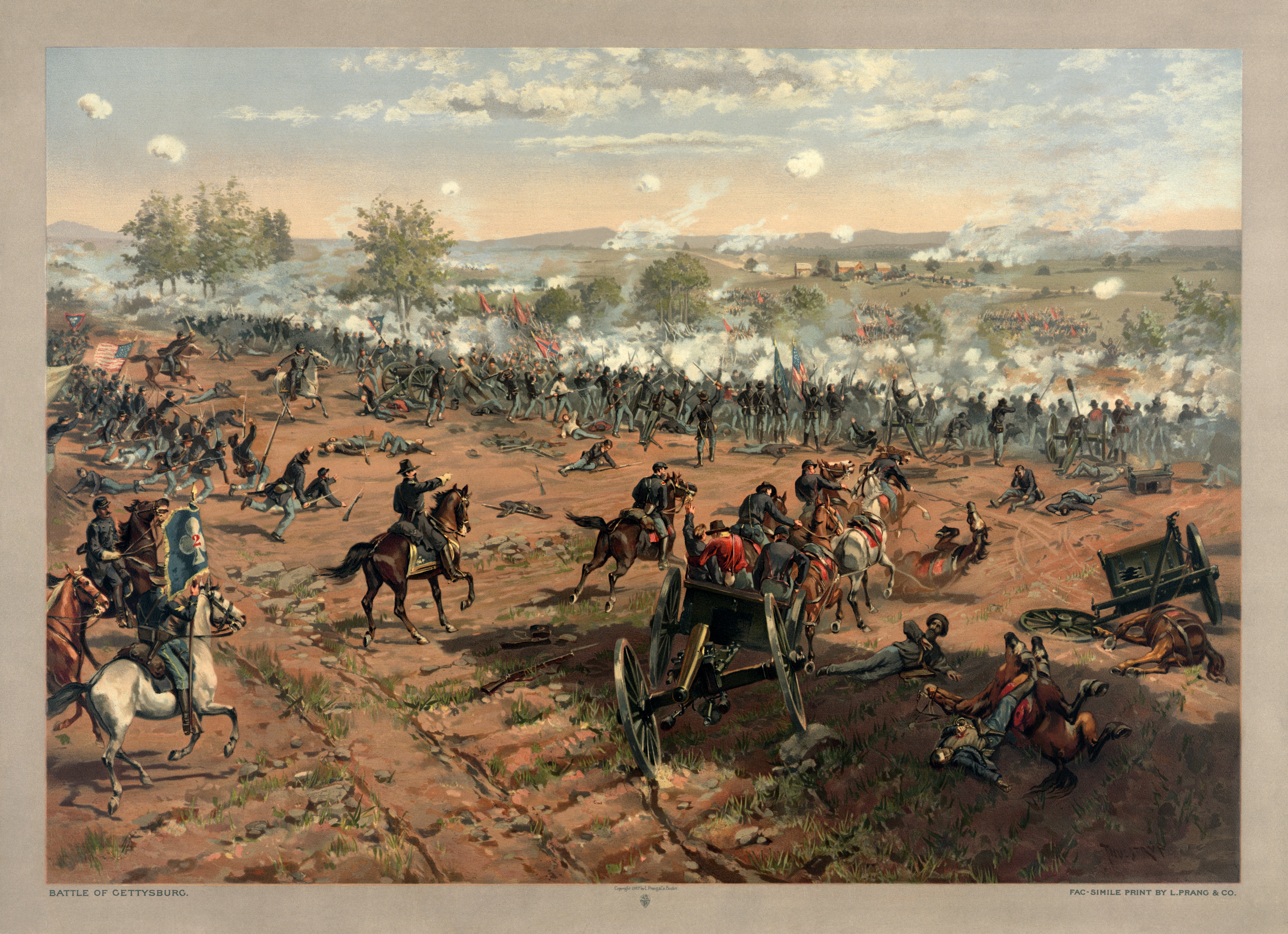
A portrait depicting Pickett's Charge on July 3, 1863, the final day of the Battle of Gettysburg, the Civil War's deadliest battle and one of its most significant, altering the course of the war in the Union's favor

Hooker was unable to defeat Lee's army. Despite having more than twice as many troops as Lee, Hooker's Chancellorsville Campaign proved ineffective, and he was soundly defeated in the Battle of Chancellorsville, which was fought between April 30 and May 6, 1863. Chancellorsville is known as Lee's "perfect battle" because his risky decision to divide his army paid off. During the Battle of Chancellorsville, Stonewall Jackson was shot in his left arm and right hand by friendly fire, leading to the amputation of his arm, and he died of pneumonia. Lee famously said: "He has lost his left arm, but I have lost my right arm."

The fiercest fighting of the battle—and the second bloodiest day of the Civil War—occurred on May 3 as Lee launched multiple attacks against the Union position at Chancellorsville. That same day, John Sedgwick advanced across the Rappahannock River, defeated the small Confederate force at Marye's Heights in the Second Battle of Fredericksburg, and then moved westward, but Confederate forces succeeded in delaying Union forces in the Battle of Salem Church.

Hooker was replaced by Maj. Gen. George Meade during Lee's second invasion of the North, in June. At Gettysburg, the war's bloodiest battle and one of its most strategically significant, Meade defeated Lee between July 1 and 3, 1863. The Battle of Gettysburg caused over 50,000 Union and Confederate casualties and was the war's turning point, altering the course of the war in the Union's favor. Pickett's Charge, launched July 3, on the final day of the Battle of Gettysburg, is considered the high-water mark of the Confederacy, representing the collapse of any credible prospect that the Confederacy could prevail in the war. At Gettysburg, Lee's Army of Northern Virginia suffered 28,000 casualties versus Meade's 23,000, and Lee was repelled in a failed attempt to invade and occupy Union territory.

== Western theater ==
The western theater refers to military operations between the Appalachian Mountains and the Mississippi River, including Alabama, Georgia, Florida, Mississippi, North Carolina, Kentucky, South Carolina, Tennessee, and parts of Louisiana.

=== Background ===
==== Army of the Cumberland and Army of the Tennessee ====
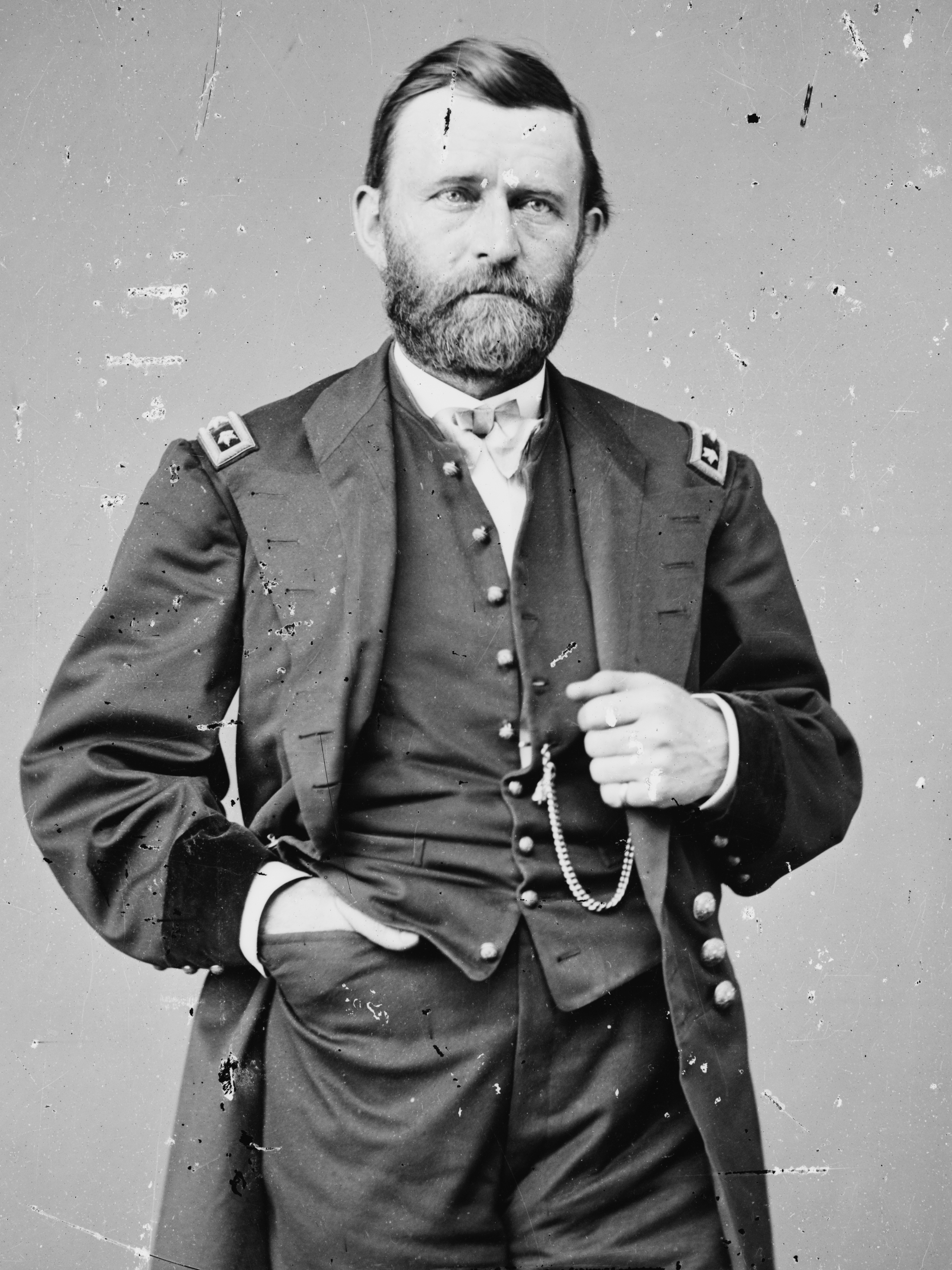
Ulysses S. Grant, a Union army general who was later elected the nation's 18th president

The primary Union forces in this theater were the Army of the Tennessee and Army of the Cumberland, named for the two rivers, Tennessee River and Cumberland River. After Meade's inconclusive fall campaign, Lincoln turned to the western theater for new leadership. At the same time, the Confederate stronghold of Vicksburg surrendered, giving the Union control of the Mississippi River, permanently isolating the western Confederacy, and producing the new leader Lincoln needed, Ulysses S. Grant.

The Army of Tennessee, which served as the primary Confederate force in the Western theater, was formed on November 20, 1862, when General Braxton Bragg renamed the former Army of Mississippi. While Confederate forces had successes in the eastern theater, they were defeated many times in the West.

=== Battles ===
The Union's key strategist and tactician in the West was Ulysses S. Grant, who led the Union to victories in battles at Fort Henry (February 6, 1862) and Fort Donelson (February 11 to 16, 1862), earning him the nickname of "Unconditional Surrender" Grant. With these victories, the Union gained control of the Tennessee and Cumberland Rivers. Nathan Bedford Forrest rallied nearly 4,000 Confederate troops and led them to escape across the Cumberland River. Nashville and central Tennessee fell to the Union, leading to attrition of local food supplies and livestock and a breakdown in social organization.

Confederate general Leonidas Polk subsequently invaded Columbus, Kentucky, which ended Kentucky's policy of neutrality and turned it against the Confederacy. Grant used river transport and Andrew Hull Foote's gunboats of the Western Flotilla, threatening the Confederacy's "Gibraltar of the West" in Columbus, Kentucky. Although rebuffed at Belmont, Grant cut off Columbus. Confederate forces, lacking their gunboats, were forced to retreat and the Union took control of west Kentucky and opened Tennessee in March 1862.

At the Battle of Shiloh, in Shiloh, Tennessee, in April 1862, Confederate forces launched a surprise attack on Union forces, pushing them back to the Tennessee River as night fell. Overnight, the Navy landed reinforcements, and Grant counterattacked. Grant and the Union ultimately won a decisive victory in the first battle with a high number of casualties in what proved to be the first in a series of such battles. Confederate forces lost Albert Sidney Johnston, considered their finest general, before Lee emerged to assume command.

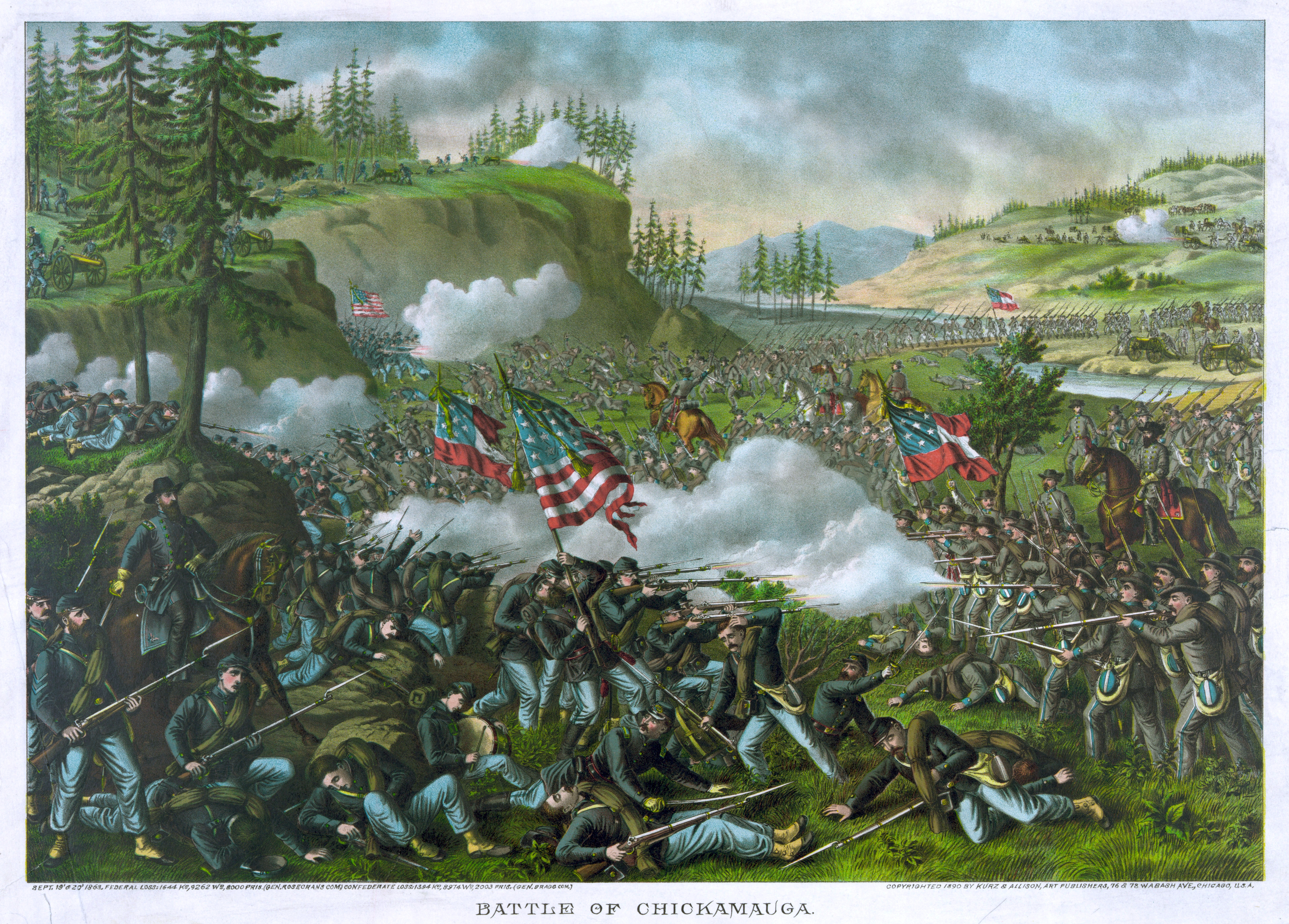
The Battle of Chickamauga, the war's highest two-day loss battle

One of the early Union objectives was to capture the Mississippi River, which would permit it to cut the Confederacy in half. The Mississippi was opened to Union traffic to the southern border of Tennessee after it took Island No. 10, New Madrid, Missouri, and then Memphis, Tennessee.

In April 1862, the Union Navy captured New Orleans. "The key to the river was New Orleans, the South's largest port [and] greatest industrial center." U.S. naval forces under Admiral David Farragut ran past Confederate defenses south of New Orleans. Confederate forces abandoned the city, giving the Union a critical anchor in the deep South, which allowed Union forces to move up the Mississippi. Memphis fell to Union forces on June 6, 1862, allowing it to serve as a key base for further Union advances south along the Mississippi. On the Mississippi River, the Union took every fortress city with the exception of Vicksburg, Mississippi. But Confederate control of Vicksburg was sufficient in preventing the Union from controlling the entire river.

Bragg's second invasion of Kentucky in the Confederate Heartland Offensive included initial successes, including Kirby Smith's triumph in the Battle of Richmond and the capture of the Kentucky capital of Frankfort, Kentucky, on September 3, 1862. The campaign ended with a meaningless victory over Maj. Gen. Don Carlos Buell at the Battle of Perryville, and Bragg was forced to end his attempt to invade and control Kentucky. Lacking logistical support and infantry recruits, Bragg was instead forced to retreat, and ended up being narrowly defeated by Maj. Gen. William Rosecrans in the Battle of Stones River in Tennessee in what proved to be the culmination of the Stones River Campaign.

US naval forces assisted Grant in the long, complex Vicksburg Campaign, which resulted in Confederate forces surrendering in the Battle of Vicksburg in July 1863, which cemented Union control of the Mississippi River in one of the war's turning points. The one clear Confederate victory in the West was the Battle of Chickamauga. After Rosecrans' successful Tullahoma Campaign, Bragg, reinforced by Lt. Gen. James Longstreet's Corps, defeated Rosecrans, despite the defensive stand of Maj. Gen. George Henry Thomas. Rosecrans retreated to Chattanooga, Tennessee, where Bragg was then besieged in the Chattanooga campaign. Grant marched to the relief of Rosecrans, where he led the defeat of Bragg in the Third Battle of Chattanooga, causing Longstreet to abandon his Knoxville Campaign, driving Confederate forces out of Tennessee, and opening a route to Atlanta and the heart of the Confederacy.

== Trans-Mississippi theater ==
=== Background ===
The trans-Mississippi theater refers to military operations west of the Mississippi, encompassing most of Missouri, Arkansas, most of Louisiana, and the Indian Territory in present-day Oklahoma. The Trans-Mississippi District was formed by the Confederate States Army to better coordinate Ben McCulloch's command of troops in Arkansas and Louisiana, Sterling Price's Missouri State Guard, as well as the portion of Earl Van Dorn's command that included the Indian Territory and excluded the Army of the West. The Union's command was the Trans-Mississippi Division, or the Military Division of West Mississippi.

=== Battles ===
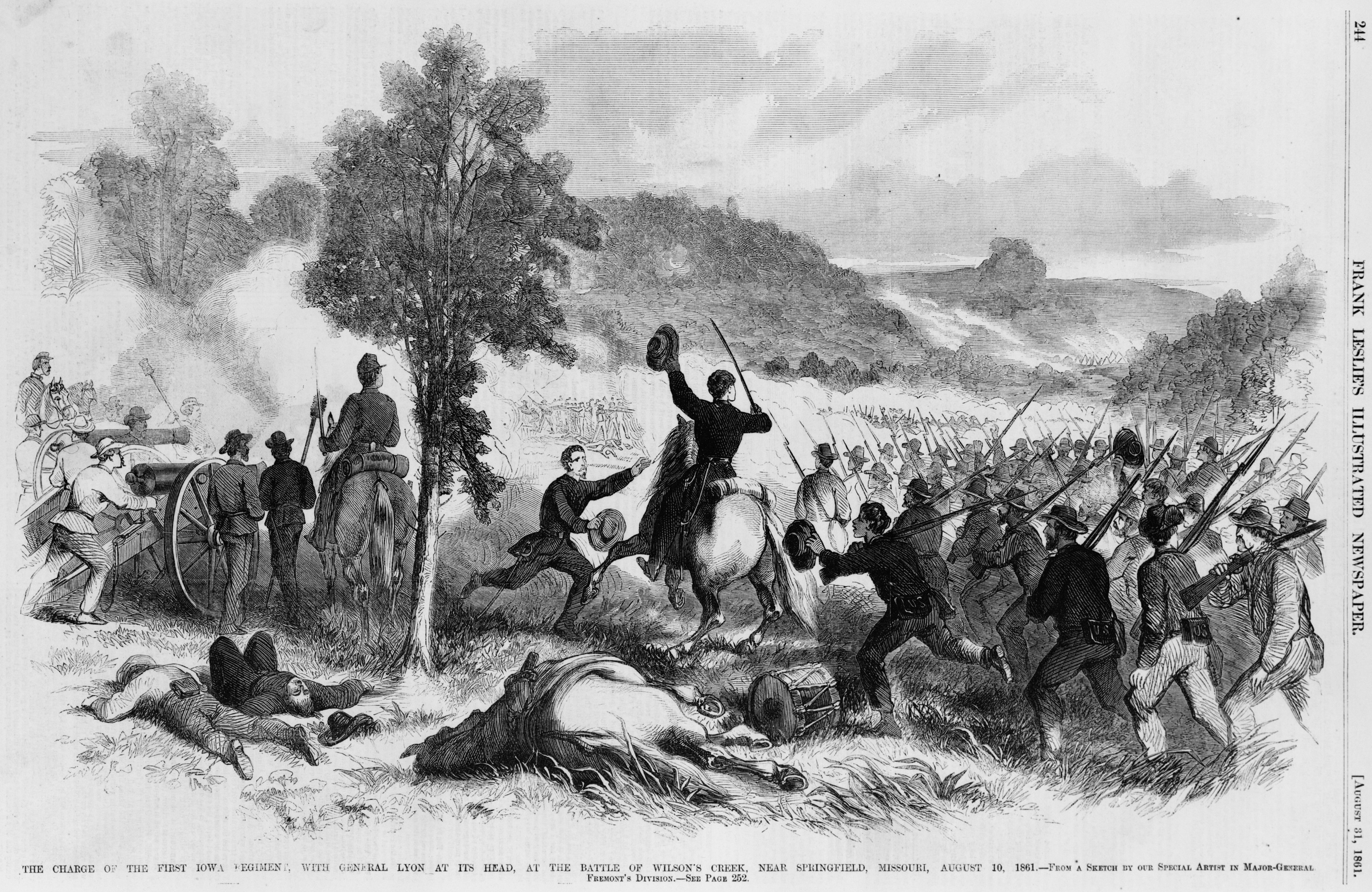
Nathaniel Lyon secured docks and arsenal in St. Louis, leading Union Army forces to expel the Missouri Confederate forces and government.

The first major battle of the trans-Mississippi theater was the Battle of Wilson's Creek (August 1861). The Confederates were driven from Missouri early in the war as a result of the Battle of Pea Ridge.

Extensive guerrilla warfare characterized the trans-Mississippi region, as the Confederacy lacked the troops and logistics to support regular armies that could challenge Union control. Roving Confederate bands such as Quantrill's Raiders terrorized the countryside, striking military installations and civilian settlements. The "Sons of Liberty" and "Order of the American Knights" attacked pro-Union people, elected officeholders, and unarmed uniformed soldiers. These partisans could not be driven out of Missouri, until an entire regular Union infantry division was engaged. By 1864, these violent activities harmed the nationwide antiwar movement organizing against the re-election of Lincoln. Missouri not only stayed in the Union, but Lincoln took 70 percent of the vote to win re-election.

Small-scale military actions south and west of Missouri sought to control Indian Territory and New Mexico Territory for the Union. The Battle of Glorieta Pass was the decisive battle of the New Mexico Campaign. The Union repulsed Confederate incursions into New Mexico in 1862, and the exiled Arizona government withdrew into Texas. In the Indian Territory, civil war broke out within tribes. About 12,000 Indian warriors fought for the Confederacy but fewer for the Union. The most prominent Cherokee was Brigadier General Stand Watie, the last Confederate general to surrender.

After the fall of Vicksburg in July 1863, Jefferson Davis informed General Kirby Smith in Texas that he could expect no further help from east of the Mississippi. Although he lacked resources to beat Union armies, he built up a formidable arsenal at Tyler, along with his own Kirby Smithdom economy, a virtual "independent fiefdom" in Texas, including railroad construction and international smuggling. The Union, in turn, did not directly engage him. The Union's 1864 Red River Campaign to take Shreveport, Louisiana, failed and Texas remained in Confederate hands throughout the war.

== Lower seaboard theater ==
=== Background ===
The lower seaboard theater refers to military and naval operations that occurred near the coastal areas of the Southeast as well as the southern part of the Mississippi. Union naval activities were dictated by the Anaconda Plan.

=== Battles ===
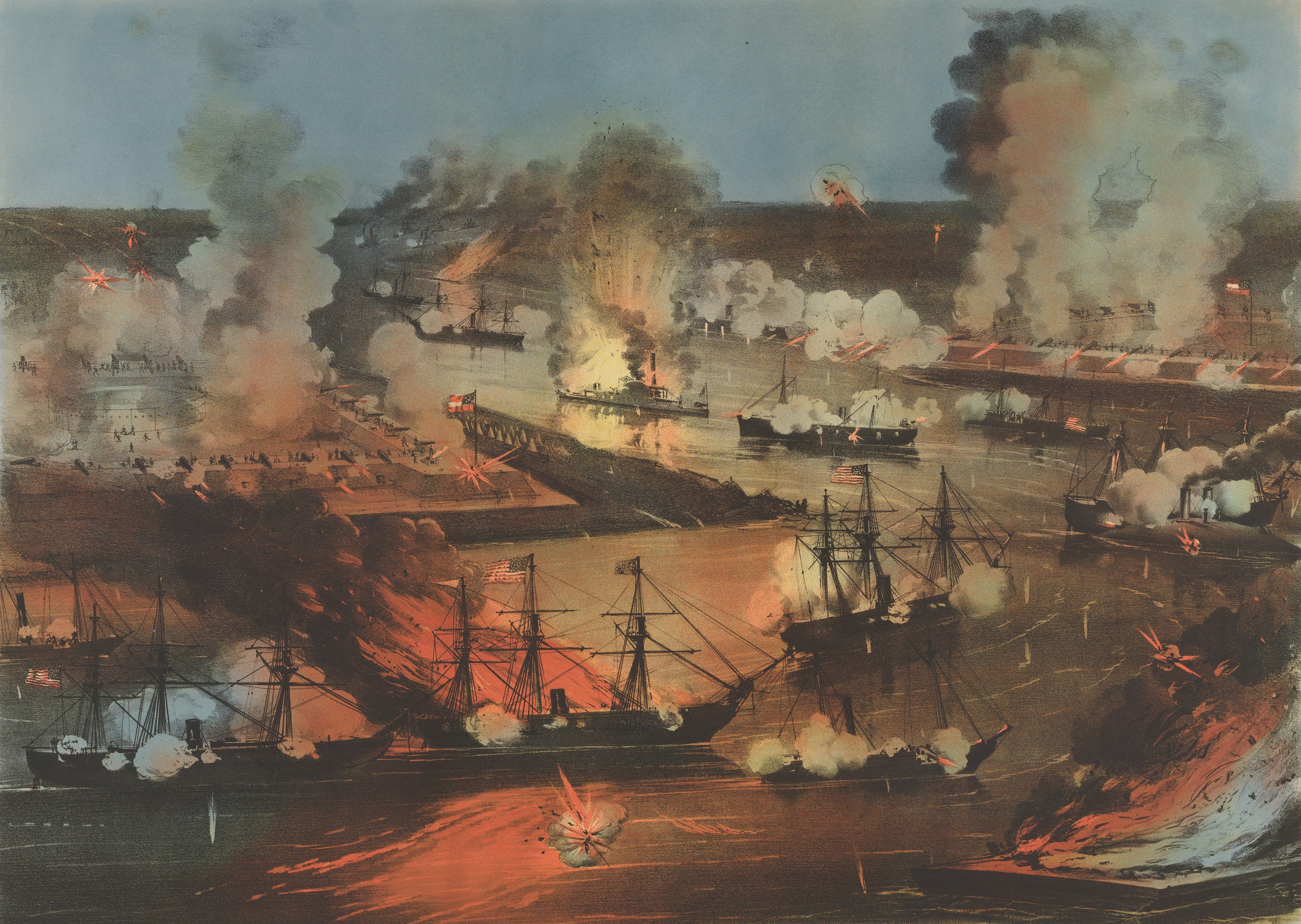
New Orleans captured

One of the earliest battles was fought in November 1861 at Port Royal Sound, south of Charleston. Much of the war along the South Carolina coast concentrated on capturing Charleston. In attempting to capture Charleston, the Union military tried two approaches: by land over James or Morris Islands or through the harbor. The Confederates were able to drive back each attack.

A famous land attack was the Second Battle of Fort Wagner, in which the 54th Massachusetts Infantry took part. The Union suffered a serious defeat, losing 1,515 soldiers while the Confederates lost only 174. The 54th was hailed for its valor, which encouraged the general acceptance of the recruitment of African American soldiers into the Union Army, which reinforced the Union's numerical advantage.

Fort Pulaski on the Georgia coast was an early target for the Union navy. Following the capture of Port Royal, an expedition was organized with engineer troops under the command of Captain Quincy Adams Gillmore, forcing a Confederate surrender. The Union army occupied the fort for the rest of the war after repairing it.

In April 1862, a Union naval task force commanded by Commander David Dixon Porter attacked Forts Jackson and St. Philip, which guarded the river approach to New Orleans from the south. While part of the fleet bombarded the forts, other vessels forced a break in the obstructions in the river and enabled the rest of the fleet to steam upriver to the city. A Union army force commanded by Maj. Gen. Benjamin Butler landed near the forts and forced their surrender. Butler's controversial command of New Orleans earned him the nickname "Beast".

In 1863, the Union Army of the Gulf commanded by Maj. Gen. Nathaniel P. Banks laid siege to Port Hudson for nearly eight weeks, the longest siege in US military history. The Confederates attempted to defend with the Bayou Teche Campaign but surrendered after Vicksburg. These surrenders gave the Union control over the Mississippi.

Several skirmishes but no major battles were fought in Florida. The biggest was the Battle of Olustee in early 1864.

== Pacific coast theater ==
The Pacific coast theater refers to military operations on the Pacific Ocean and in the states and territories west of the Continental Divide.

== Conquest of Virginia ==
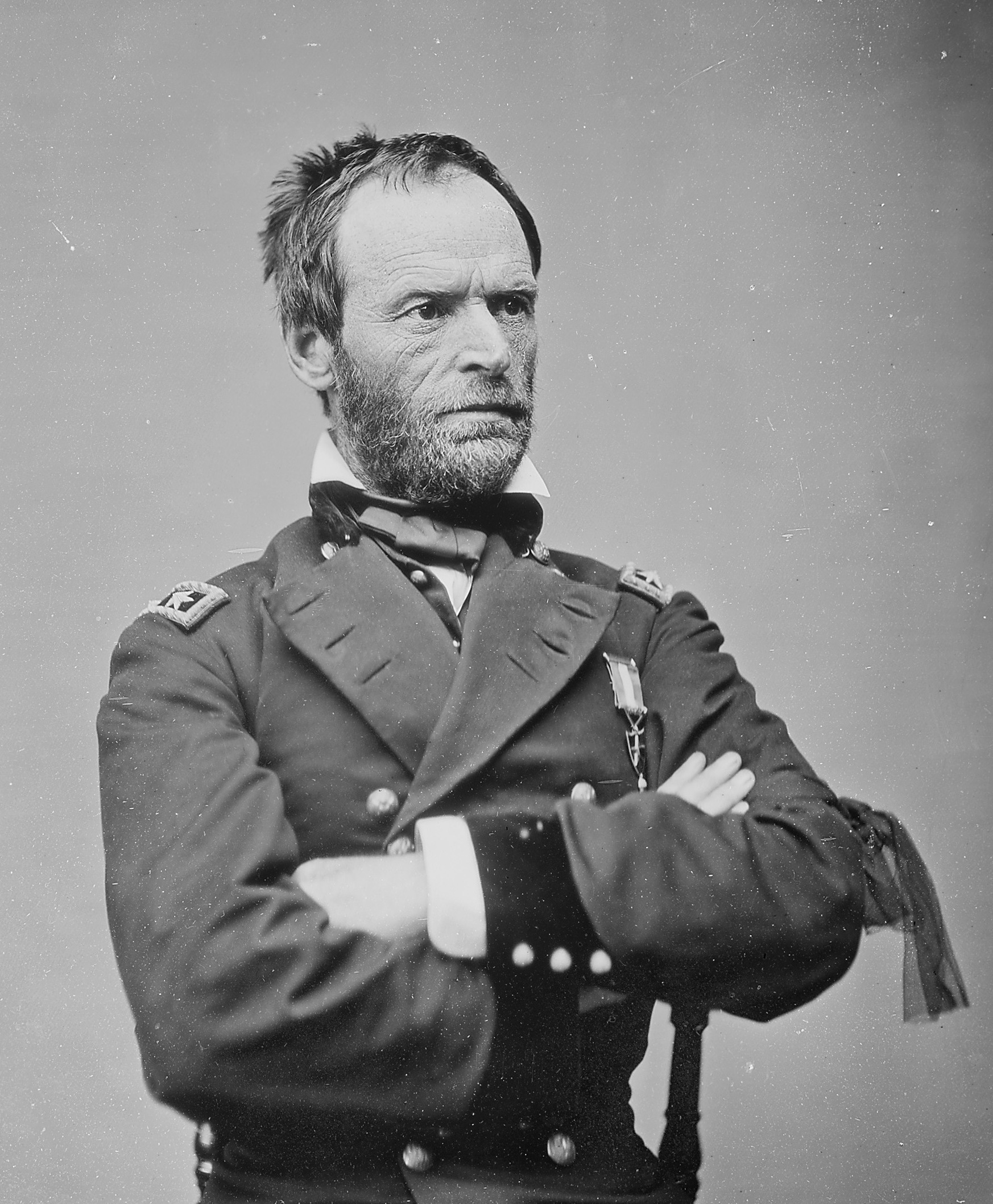
General William Tecumseh Sherman

At the beginning of 1864, Lincoln made Grant commander of all Union armies. Grant made his headquarters with the Army of the Potomac and put Maj. Gen. William Tecumseh Sherman in command of most of the western armies. Grant understood the concept of total war and believed, along with Lincoln and Sherman, that only the utter defeat of Confederate forces and their economic base would end the war. This was total war not in killing civilians, but in injuring the Confederacy's capacity to produce and transport the supplies needed to continue the war. Sherman, at Grant's direction, seized provisions and destroyed homes, farms, and railroads, which Grant said "would otherwise have gone to the support of secession and rebellion. This policy I believe exercised a material influence in hastening the end."

Grant devised a coordinated strategy that would strike at the entire Confederacy from multiple directions. Generals Meade and Benjamin Butler were ordered to move against Lee near Richmond, General Franz Sigel was to attack the Shenandoah Valley, General Sherman was to capture Atlanta and march to the Atlantic Ocean, Generals George Crook and William W. Averell were to operate against railroad supply lines in West Virginia, and Maj. Gen. Nathaniel P. Banks was to capture Mobile, Alabama.

=== Grant's Overland Campaign ===
Grant's army set out on the Overland Campaign intending to draw Lee into a defense of Richmond, where they would attempt to pin down and destroy the Confederate army. The Union army first attempted to maneuver past Lee and fought several battles, notably at the Wilderness, Spotsylvania, and Cold Harbor. These resulted in heavy losses on both sides and forced Lee's Confederates to fall back repeatedly. At the Battle of Yellow Tavern, the Confederates lost Jeb Stuart.

An attempt to outflank Lee from the south failed under Butler, who was trapped inside the Bermuda Hundred river bend. Each battle resulted in setbacks for the Union that mirrored those they had suffered under prior generals, though unlike them, Grant chose to fight on rather than retreat. Grant was tenacious and kept pressing Lee's Army of Northern Virginia back to Richmond. While Lee was preparing for an attack on Richmond, Grant unexpectedly turned south to cross the James River and began the protracted Siege of Petersburg, where the two armies engaged in trench warfare for over nine months.

=== Sheridan's Valley Campaign ===
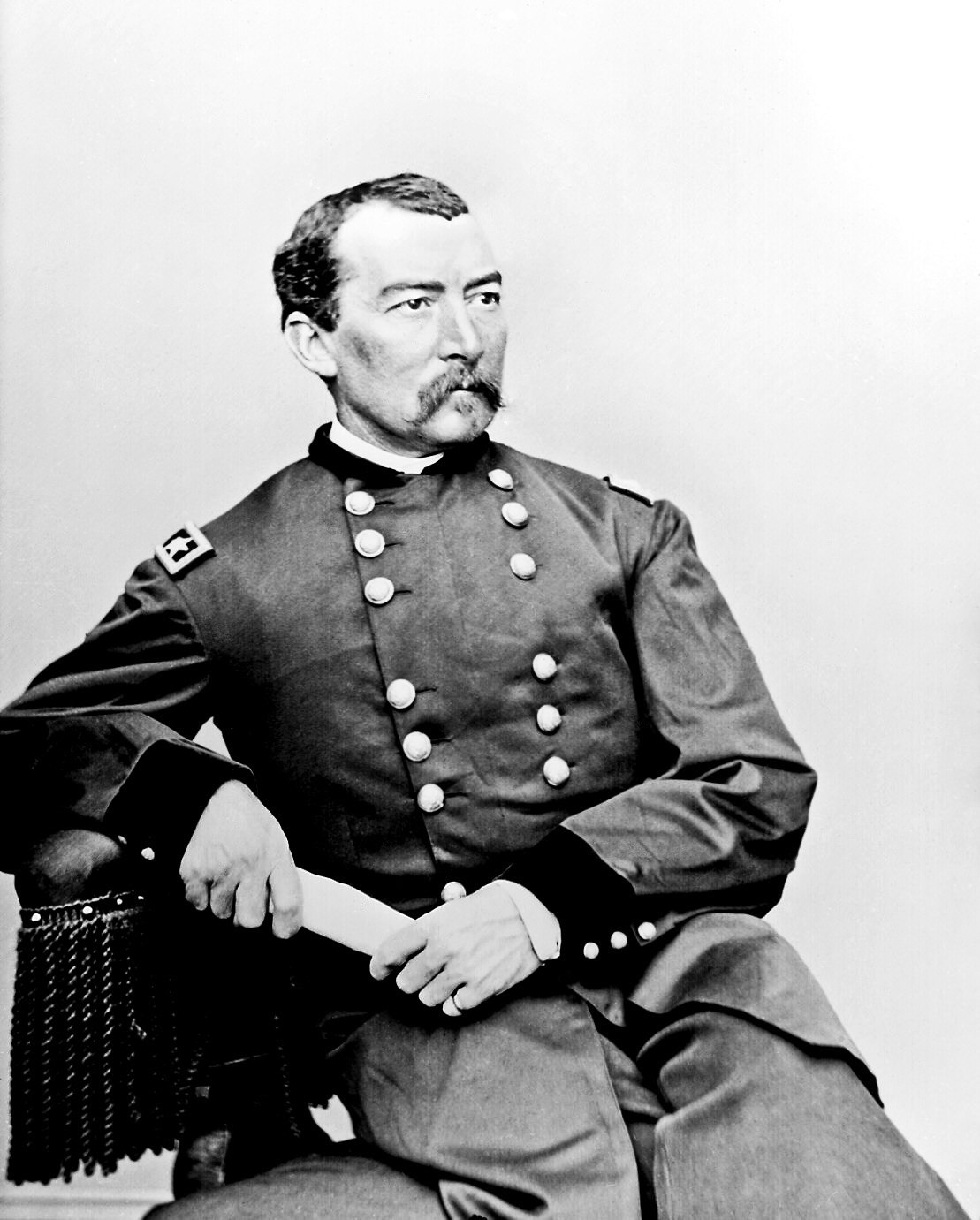
Philip Sheridan

To deny the Confederacy continued use of the Shenandoah Valley as a base from which to launch invasions of Maryland and the Washington area, and to threaten Lee's supply lines for his forces, Grant launched the Valley campaigns in May 1864. Initial efforts led by Gen. Sigel were repelled at the Battle of New Market by Confederate Gen. John C. Breckinridge. The Battle of New Market was the Confederacy's last major victory, and included a charge by teenage VMI cadets. After relieving Sigel, and following mixed performances by his successor, Grant finally found a commander, General Philip Sheridan, aggressive enough to prevail against the army of Maj. Gen. Jubal A. Early. After a cautious start, Sheridan defeated Early in a series of battles in September and October 1864, including a decisive defeat at the Battle of Cedar Creek. Sheridan then proceeded through that winter to destroy the agricultural base of the Shenandoah Valley, a strategy similar to the tactics Sherman later employed in Georgia.

=== Sherman's March to the Sea and Carolinas campaign ===
Meanwhile, Sherman maneuvered from Chattanooga to Atlanta, defeating Confederate Generals Joseph E. Johnston and John Bell Hood. The fall of Atlanta on September 2, 1864, guaranteed the reelection of Lincoln. Hood left the Atlanta area to swing around and menace Sherman's supply lines and invade Tennessee in the Franklin–Nashville Campaign. Union Maj. Gen. John Schofield defeated Hood at the Battle of Franklin, and George H. Thomas dealt Hood a massive defeat at the Battle of Nashville, effectively destroying Hood's army.

Leaving Atlanta, and his base of supplies, Sherman's army marched, with no destination set, laying waste to about 20 percent of the farms in Georgia on his March to the Sea. He reached the Atlantic at Savannah, Georgia, in December 1864. Sherman's army was followed by thousands of freed slaves; there were no major battles along the march. Sherman turned north through South Carolina and North Carolina in his Carolinas campaign, to approach the Confederate Virginia lines from the south, increasing the pressure on Lee's army.

=== The Waterloo of the Confederacy ===
Lee's army, thinned by desertion and casualties, was now much smaller than Grant's. One last Confederate attempt to break the Union hold on Petersburg failed at the decisive Battle of Five Forks on April 1. The Union now controlled the entire perimeter surrounding Richmond–Petersburg, completely cutting it off from the Confederacy. Realizing the capital was now lost, Lee's army and the Confederate government were forced to evacuate. The Confederate capital fell on April 2–3, to the Union XXV Corps, composed of black troops. The remaining Confederate units fled west after a defeat at Sayler's Creek on April 6.

== End of the war ==
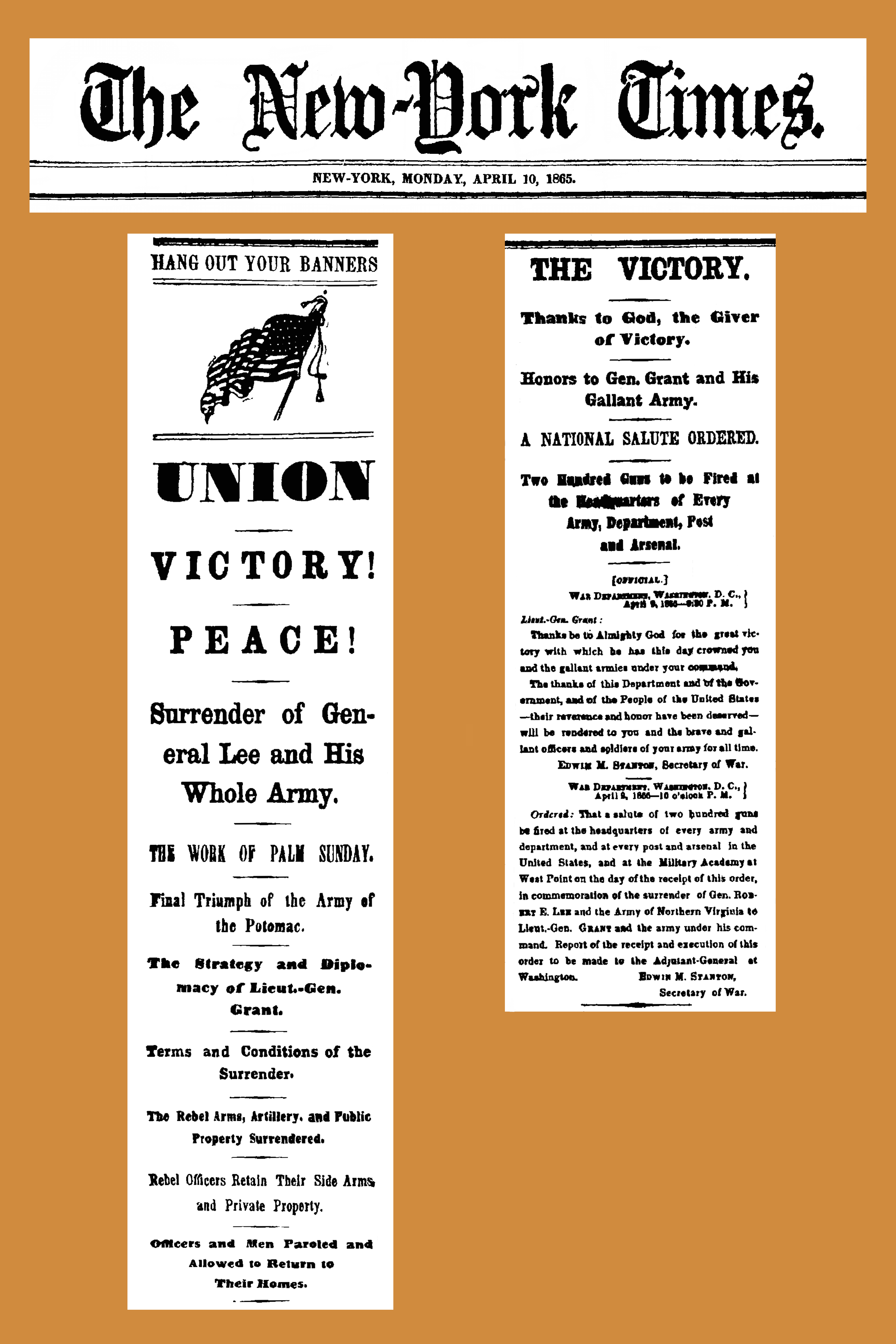
This New York Times front page celebrated Lee's surrender, headlining how Grant let Confederate officers retain their sidearms and "paroled" the Confederate officers and men.

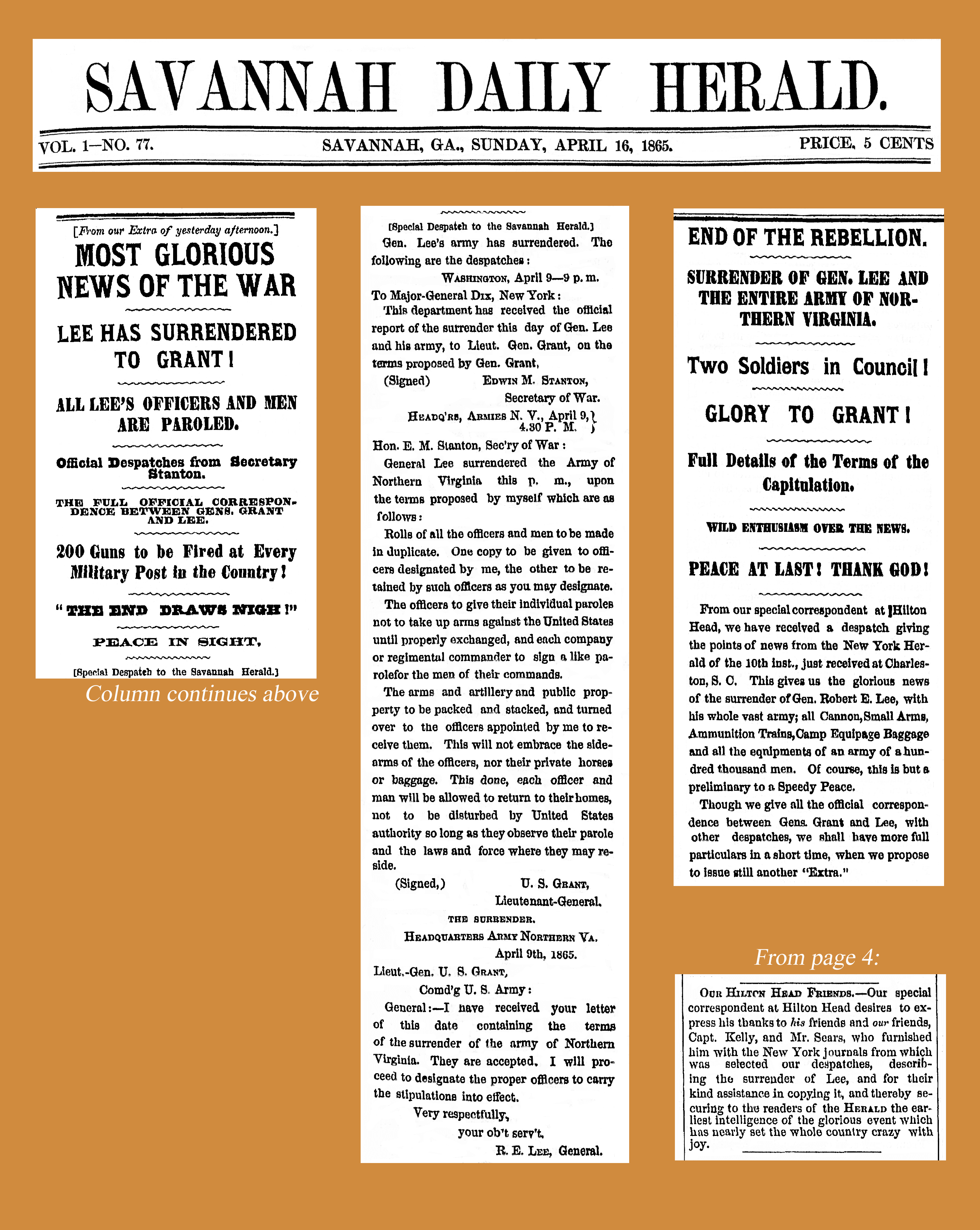
News of Lee's April 9 surrender reached this southern newspaper (Savannah, Georgia) on April 15—after the April 14 shooting of President Lincoln. The article quotes Grant's terms of surrender.

Lee did not intend to surrender, but planned to regroup at Appomattox Station, where supplies were to be waiting, and then continue the war. Grant chased Lee and got in front of him, so that when Lee's army reached the village of Appomattox Court House, they were surrounded. After an initial battle, Lee decided the fight was hopeless, and surrendered his Army of Northern Virginia to Grant on April 9, 1865, during a conference at the McLean House. In an untraditional gesture and as a sign of Grant's respect and anticipation of peacefully restoring Confederate states to the Union, Lee was permitted to keep his sword and horse, Traveller. His men were paroled, and a chain of Confederate surrenders began.

On April 14, 1865, Lincoln was shot by John Wilkes Booth, a Confederate sympathizer. Lincoln died early the next morning. Lincoln's vice president, Andrew Johnson, was unharmed, because his would-be assassin, George Atzerodt, lost his nerve, so Johnson was immediately sworn in as president.

Meanwhile, Confederate forces across the South surrendered, as news of Lee's surrender reached them. (Note: Unaware of the surrender of Lee, on April 16 the last major battles of the war were fought at the Battle of Columbus, Georgia, and the Battle of West Point.) On April 26, the same day Sergeant Boston Corbett killed Booth at a tobacco barn, Johnston surrendered nearly 90,000 troops of the Army of Tennessee to Sherman at Bennett Place, near present-day Durham, North Carolina. It proved to be the largest surrender of Confederate forces. On May 4, all remaining Confederate forces in Alabama, Mississippi, and Louisiana east of the Mississippi, under the command of Lt. General Richard Taylor, surrendered. Confederate president Davis was captured in retreat at Irwinville, Georgia on May 10.

The final land battle was fought on May 13, 1865, at the Battle of Palmito Ranch in Texas. On May 26, 1865, Confederate Lt. Gen. Simon B. Buckner, acting for Edmund Smith, signed a military convention surrendering Confederate forces in the Trans-Mississippi Department. This date is often cited by contemporaries and historians as the effective end date of the war. On June 2, with most of his troops having already gone home, a reluctant Kirby Smith had little choice but to sign the official surrender document. On June 23, Cherokee leader and Brig. General Stand Watie became the last Confederate general to surrender his forces.

On June 19, 1865, Union Maj. Gen. Gordon Granger announced General Order No. 3, bringing the Emancipation Proclamation into effect in Texas and freeing the last slaves of the Confederacy. The anniversary of this date is now celebrated as Juneteenth.

The naval part of the war ended more slowly. On April 11, two days after Lee's surrender, when Lincoln proclaimed that foreign nations had no further "claim or pretense" to deny equality of maritime rights and hospitalities to US warships and, in effect, that rights extended to Confederate ships to use neutral ports as safe havens from US warships should end. Having no response to Lincoln's proclamation, President Johnson issued a similar proclamation dated May 10, more directly stating that the war was almost at an end and insurgent cruisers still at sea, and prepared to attack US ships, should not have rights to do so through use of safe foreign ports or waters.

Britain responded on June 6, by transmitting a letter from Foreign Secretary John Russell, 1st Earl Russell, to the Lords of the Admiralty withdrawing rights to Confederate warships to enter British ports and waters. US Secretary of State Seward welcomed the withdrawal of concessions to the Confederates.

On October 18, Russell advised the Admiralty that the time specified in his June message had elapsed and "all measures of a restrictive nature on vessels of war of the United States in British ports, harbors, and waters, are now to be considered as at an end". Nonetheless, the final Confederate surrender was in Liverpool, England where James Iredell Waddell, the captain of CSS Shenandoah, surrendered the cruiser to British authorities on November 6.

Legally, the war ended on August 20, 1866, when President Johnson issued a proclamation that declared "that the said insurrection is at an end and that peace, order, tranquillity, and civil authority now exist in and throughout the whole of the United States of America". (Note: Murray 1967, p. 336; Neff 2010, p. 207; Trudeau 1994, p. 396. In United States v. Anderson, 76 U.S. 56 (1869), "The U.S. attorneys argued that the Rebellion had been suppressed following the surrender of the Trans-Mississippi Department, as established in the surrender document negotiated on May 26, 1865."; Trudeau 1994, p. 397. The Supreme Court decided that the "legal end of the American Civil War had been decided by Congress to be August 20, 1866—the date of Andrew Johnson's final proclamation on the conclusion of the Rebellion.")

== Union victory ==
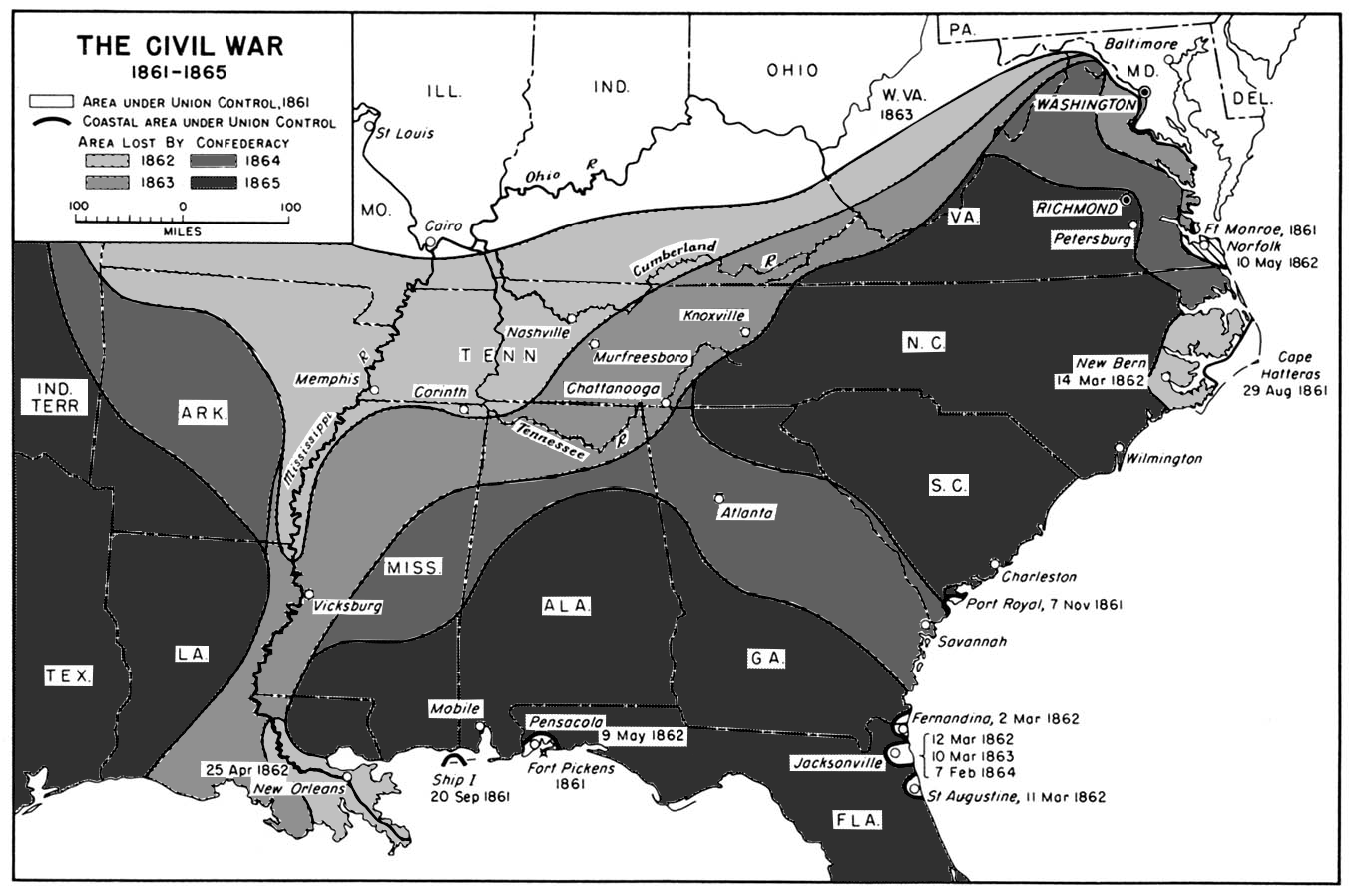
A map of Confederate territory losses year by year

The causes of the war, reasons for its outcome, and even its name are subjects of lingering contention. The North and West grew wealthy while the once-rich South became poor for a century. The national political power of the slaveowners and rich Southerners ended. Historians are less sure about the results of postwar Reconstruction, especially regarding the second-class citizenship of the freedmen and their poverty.

Historians have debated whether the Confederacy could have won the war. Most scholars, including James M. McPherson, argue Confederate victory was possible. McPherson argues that the North's advantage in population and resources made Northern victory likely, but not guaranteed. He argues that if the Confederacy had fought using unconventional tactics, it would have more easily been able to hold out long enough to exhaust the Union. Confederates did not need to invade and hold enemy territory to win, but only to fight a defensive war to convince the North the cost of winning was too high. The North needed to conquer and hold vast stretches of enemy territory and defeat Confederate armies to win. Lincoln was not a military dictator and could fight only as long as the American public supported the war. The Confederacy sought to win independence by outlasting Lincoln; however, after Atlanta fell and Lincoln defeated McClellan in the election of 1864, hope for a political victory for the South ended. Lincoln had secured the support of the Republicans, War Democrats, border states, emancipated slaves, and the neutrality of Britain and France. By defeating the Democrats and McClellan, he defeated the Copperheads, who had wanted a negotiated peace with the Confederacy.

Comparison of Union and Confederacy, 1860–1864
	Year	Union	Confederacy
Population	1860	22,100,000 (71%)	9,100,000 (29%)
Population	1864	28,800,000 (90%) (Note: "Union population 1864" aggregates 1860 population, average annual immigration 1855–1864, and population governed formerly by CSA per Kenneth Martis source. Contrabands and after the Emancipation Proclamation freedmen, migrating into Union control on the coasts and to the advancing armies, and natural increase are excluded.)	3,000,000 (10%)
Free	1860	21,700,000 (98%)	5,600,000 (62%)
Slave	1860	490,000 (2%)	3,550,000 (38%)
Slave	1864	negligible	1,900,000 (Note: "Slave 1864, CSA" aggregates 1860 slave census of Virginia, North Carolina, South Carolina, Georgia and Texas. It omits losses from contraband and after the Emancipation Proclamation, freedmen migrating to the Union controlled coastal ports and those joining advancing Union armies, especially in the Mississippi Valley.)
Soldiers	1860–64	2,100,000 (67%)	1,064,000 (33%)
Railroad miles	1860	21,800 (71%)	8,800 (29%)
Railroad miles	1864	29,100 (98%) (Note: "Total Union railroad miles" aggregates existing track reported 1860 @ 21800 plus new construction 1860–1864 @ 5000, plus southern railroads administered by USMRR @ 2300.)	negligible
Manufactures	1860	90%	10%
Manufactures	1864	98%	2%
Arms production	1860	97%	3%
Arms production	1864	98%	2%
Cotton bales	1860	negligible	4,500,000
Cotton bales	1864	300,000	negligible
Exports	1860	30%	70%
Exports	1864	98%	2%

Some scholars argue the Union held an insurmountable long-term advantage over the Confederacy in industrial strength and population. Confederate actions, they argue, only delayed defeat. Historian Shelby Foote expressed this view succinctly:

I think that the North fought that war with one hand behind its back.... If there had been more Southern victories, and a lot more, the North simply would have brought that other hand out from behind its back. I don't think the South ever had a chance to win that War.

A minority view among historians is that the Confederacy lost because, as E. Merton Coulter put it, "people did not will hard enough and long enough to win". However, most historians reject the argument. McPherson, after reading thousands of letters written by Confederate soldiers, found strong patriotism that continued to the end; they truly believed they were fighting for freedom and liberty. Even as the Confederacy was visibly collapsing in 1864–1865, most Confederate soldiers were fighting hard. Historian Gary Gallagher cites General Sherman, who in early 1864 commented, "The devils seem to have a determination that cannot but be admired." Despite their loss of slaves and wealth, with starvation looming, Sherman continued, "yet I see no sign of let-up—some few deserters—plenty tired of war, but the masses determined to fight it out".

Also important were Lincoln's eloquence in articulating the national purpose and his skill in keeping the border states committed to the Union cause. The Emancipation Proclamation was an effective use of the president's war powers. The Confederate government failed to get Europe involved militarily. Southern leaders needed to get European powers to help break the blockade the Union had created around Southern ports. Lincoln's naval blockade was 95 percent effective at stopping trade goods; as a result, imports and exports to the South declined significantly. The abundance of European cotton and Britain's hostility to slavery, along with Lincoln's naval blockades, severely decreased any chance that Britain or France would enter the war.

Historian Don H. Doyle has argued that the Union victory had a major impact on world history. The Union victory energized popular democratic forces. A Confederate victory, on the other hand, would have meant a new birth of slavery, not of freedom. Historian Fergus Bordewich, following Doyle, argues:

The North's victory decisively proved the durability of democratic government. Confederate independence, on the other hand, would have established an American model for reactionary politics and race-based repression that would likely have cast an international shadow into the 20th century and perhaps beyond.

Scholars have debated what the effects of the war were on political and economic power in the South. The prevailing view is that the southern planter elite retained its powerful position in the South. However, a 2017 study challenges this, noting that while some Southern elites retained their economic status, the turmoil of the 1860s created greater opportunities for economic mobility in the South, than in the North.

== Casualties ==
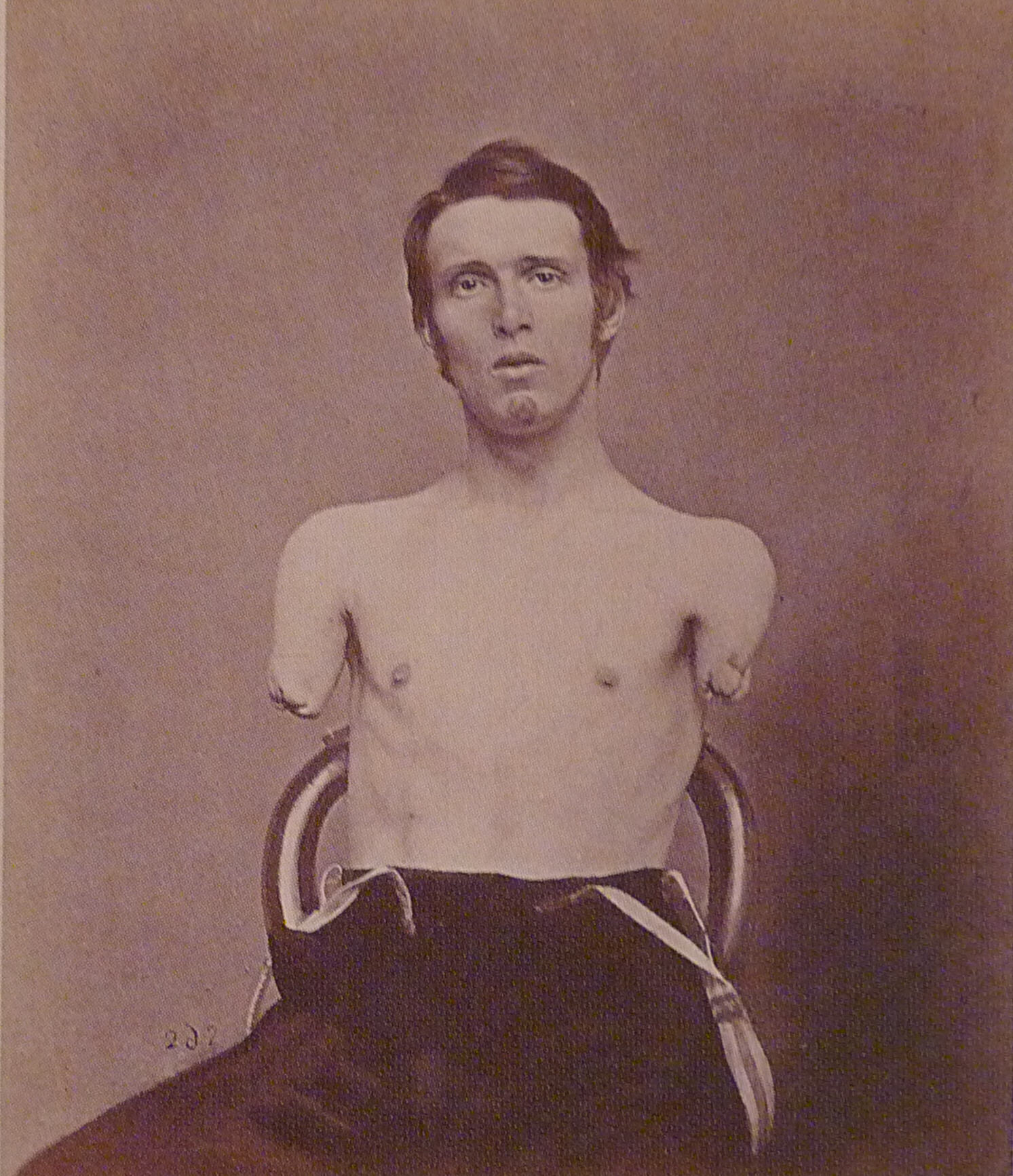
One in thirteen veterans were amputees.

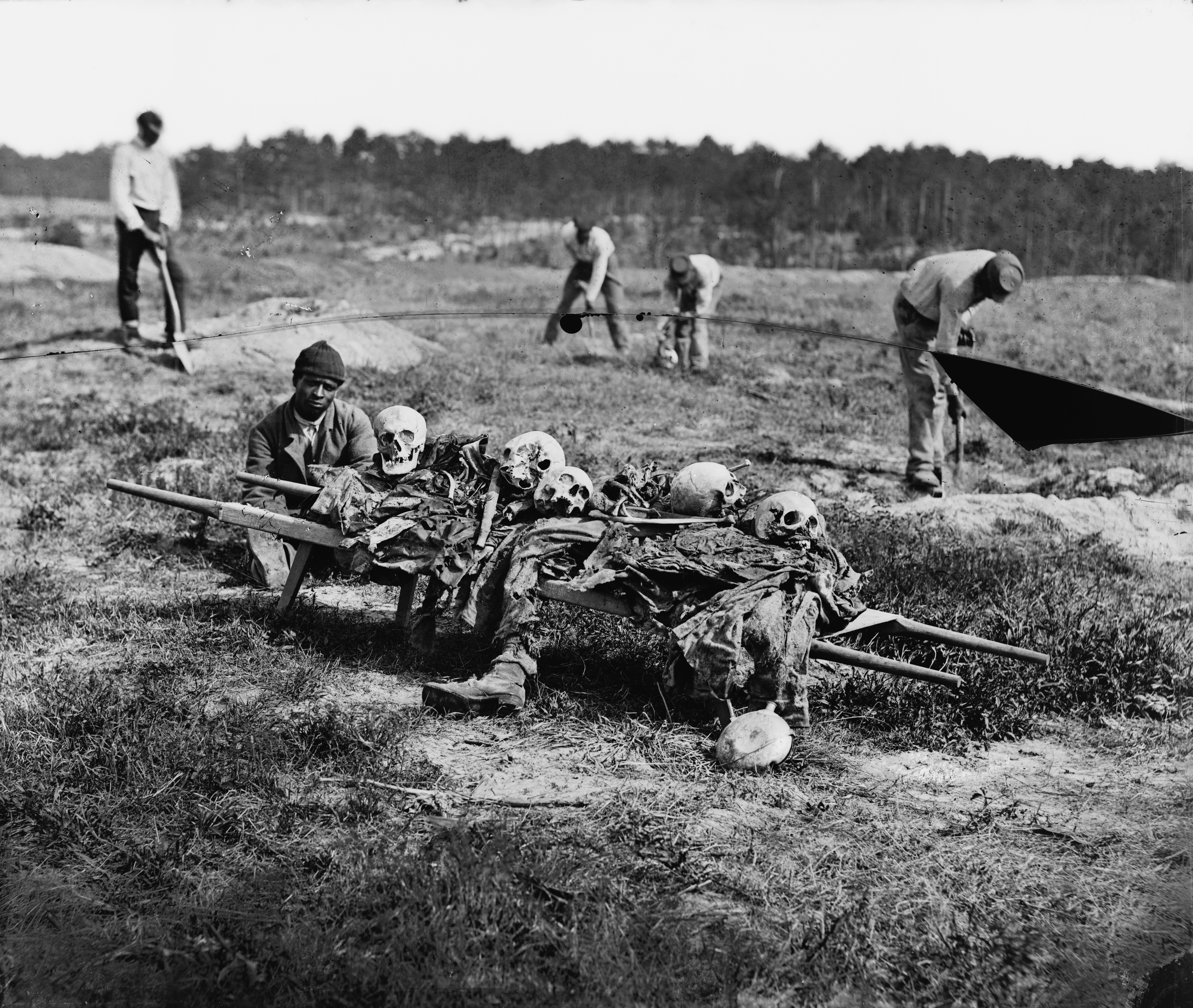
Remains of both sides were reinterred.

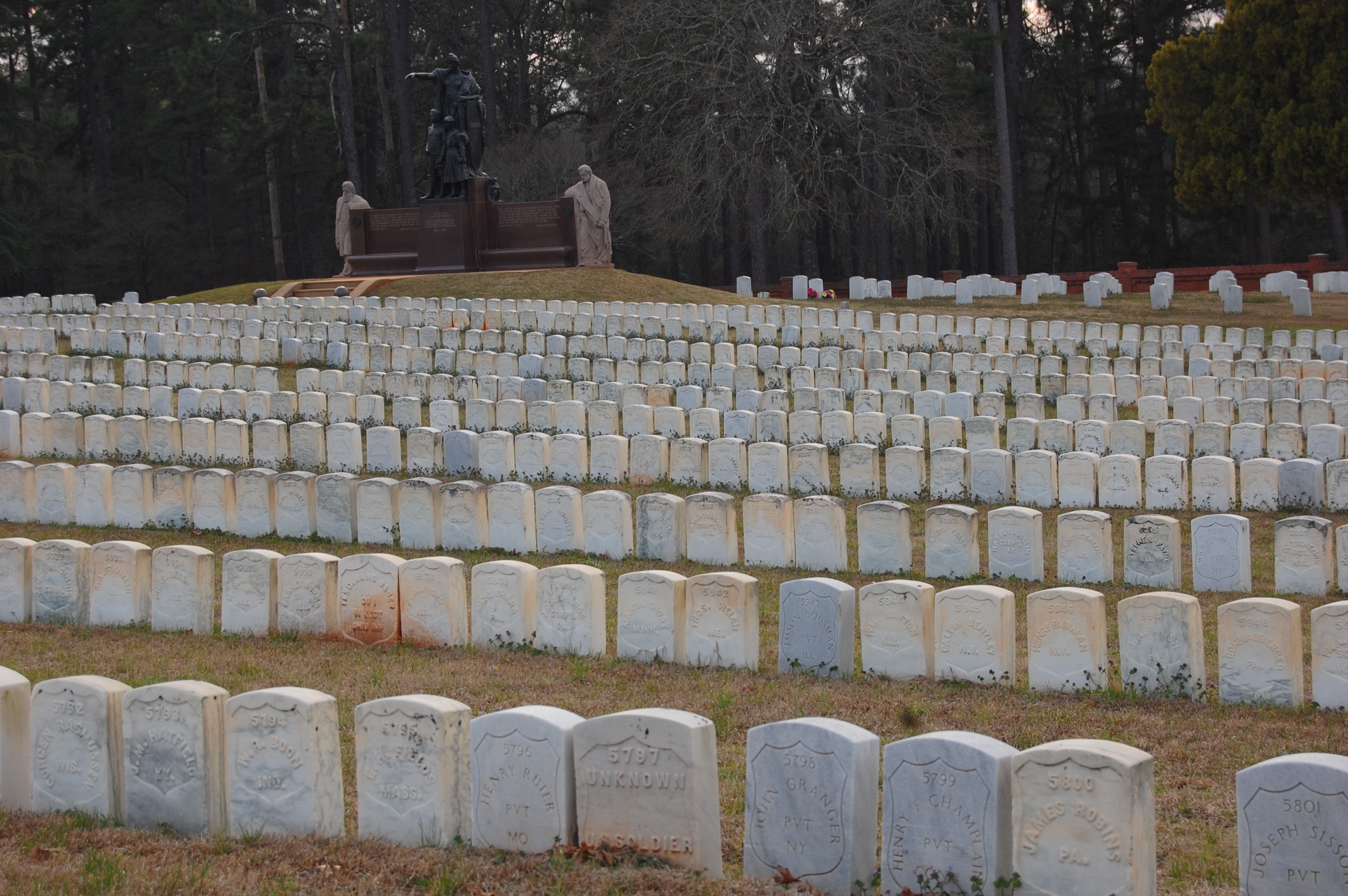
Andersonville National Cemetery, Georgia

Casualties according to the US National Park Service
Category	Union	Confederate
Killed in action	110,100	94,000
Disease	224,580	164,000
Wounded in action	275,154	194,026
Captured (inc those who died as POWs)	211,411 (30,192)	462,634 (31,000)
Total	821,245	914,660

Exact casualty figures were collected for the Union, but Confederate records were poorly kept, or lost in the chaos of defeat. Thus, the casualty figures are imprecise and based on statistical extrapolation. Neither side kept a tally of civilian deaths due to the war. In the 19th century, the death toll had been estimated at a lower 620,000. In 2011, the death toll was recalculated based on a 1% sample of census data, yielding approximately 750,000 soldier deaths, 20 percent higher than traditionally estimated, and possibly as high as 850,000. The figure was recalculated to 698,000 soldier deaths in 2024 after examining newly available full census records. Mortality rates among men were as high as 19 percent in Louisiana, and 16.6–16.7 percent in Georgia and South Carolina respectively.

The war resulted in at least 1,030,000 casualties (3 percent of the population), including an estimated 698,000 soldier deaths—two-thirds by disease. Based on 1860 census figures, 8 percent of all white men aged 13–43 died in the war, including 6 percent in the North and 18 percent in the South. About 56,000 soldiers died in prison camps during the War. An estimated 60,000 soldiers lost limbs. As McPherson notes, the war's "cost in American lives was as great as in all of the nation's other wars combined through Vietnam".

Of the 359,528 Union Army dead, amounting to 15 percent of the over two million who served:

- 110,070 were killed in action (67,000) or died of wounds (43,000).
- 199,790 died of disease (75 percent was due to the war, the remainder would have occurred in civilian life anyway)
- 24,866 died in Confederate prison camps
- 9,058 were killed by accidents or drowning
- 15,741 other/unknown deaths

In addition, there were 4,523 deaths in the Navy (2,112 in battle) and 460 in the Marines (148 in battle).

After the Emancipation Proclamation authorized freed slaves to "be received into the armed service of the United States", former slaves who escaped from plantations or were liberated by the Union Army were recruited into the United States Colored Troops regiments of the Union Army, as were black men who had not been slaves. The US Colored Troops made up 10 percent of the Union death toll—15 percent of Union deaths from disease and less than 3 percent of those killed in battle. Losses among African Americans were high. In the last year and a half and from all reported casualties, approximately 20 percent of all African Americans enrolled in the military died during the war. Their mortality rate was significantly higher than white soldiers. While 15 percent of US Volunteers and just 9 percent of white Regular Army troops died, 21 percent of US Colored Troops died.

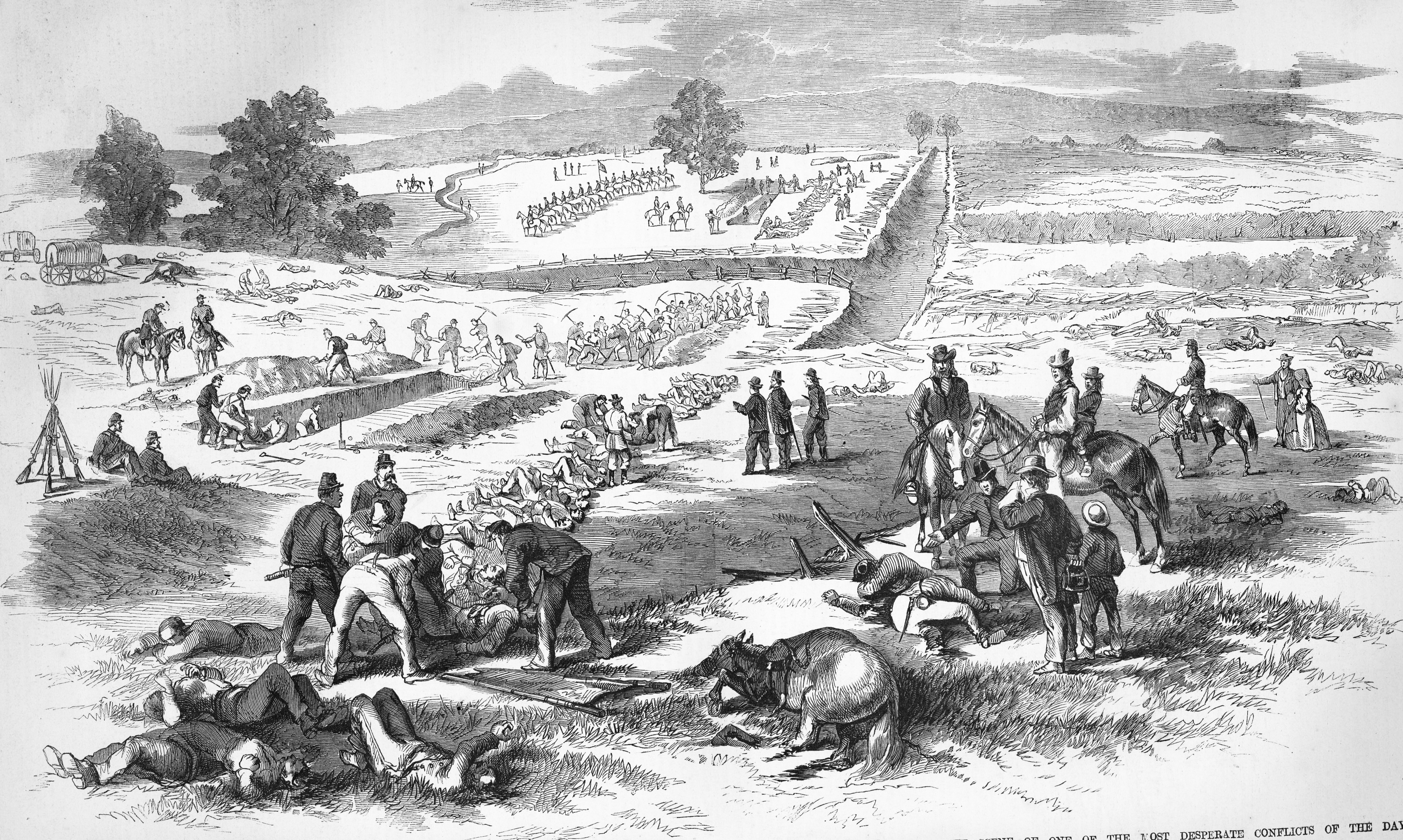
An illustration of the war dead following the Battle of Antietam battlefield in 1862

While the figures of 360,000 army deaths for the Union and 260,000 for the Confederacy remained commonly cited, they are incomplete. In addition to many Confederate records being missing, partly as a result of Confederate widows not reporting deaths due to being ineligible for benefits, both armies only counted troops who died during their service and not the tens of thousands who died of wounds or diseases after being discharged. This often happened only days or weeks later. Francis Amasa Walker, superintendent of the 1870 census, used census and surgeon general data to estimate a minimum of 500,000 Union military deaths and 350,000 Confederate military deaths, a total of 850,000 soldiers. While Walker's estimates were originally dismissed because of the 1870 census's undercounting, it was later found that the census was only off by 6.5 percent and that the data Walker used would be roughly accurate.

Losses were far higher than during the war with Mexico, which saw roughly 13,000 American deaths, including fewer than two thousand killed in battle, between 1846 and 1848. One reason for the high number of battle deaths in the civil war was the continued use of tactics similar to those of the Napoleonic Wars, such as charging. With the advent of more accurate rifled barrels, Minié balls, and (near the end of the war for the Union) repeating firearms such as the Spencer repeating rifle and the Henry repeating rifle, soldiers were mowed down when standing in lines in the open. This led to the adoption of trench warfare, a style of fighting that defined much of World War I.

Deaths among former slaves has proven hard to estimate, due to the lack of reliable census data, though they were known to be considerable, as former slaves were set free or escaped in massive numbers in areas where the Union army did not have sufficient shelter, doctors, or food for them. Professor Jim Downs states that tens of thousands to hundreds of thousands of slaves died during the war from disease, starvation, or exposure, and that if these deaths are counted in the war's total, the death toll would exceed 1 million.

It is estimated that during the war, of the equines killed, including horses, mules, donkeys and even confiscated children's ponies, over 32,600 of them belonged to the Union and 45,800 the Confederacy. Other estimates place the total at 1,000,000.

It is estimated that 544 Confederate flags were captured during the war by the Union. The flags were sent to the War Department in Washington. The Union flags captured by the Confederates were sent to Richmond.

== Emancipation ==
Abolition of slavery in the various states of the US over time: Abolition of slavery during or shortly after the American Revolution (Vermont, 1777; Massachusetts [including Maine], 1783) The Northwest Ordinance, 1787 Gradual emancipation in New York (starting 1799, ended 1827), Pennsylvania (1780–1857), New Hampshire (1783–1857), Connecticut [including the Western Reserve] (1784–1848), Rhode Island (1784–1853) and New Jersey (starting 1804; ended by Thirteenth Amendment, 1865) The Missouri Compromise, 1821 Effective abolition of slavery by Mexican or joint US/British authority Abolition of slavery by Congressional action, 1861 Abolition of slavery by Congressional action, 1862 Emancipation Proclamation as originally issued, 1 Jan 1863 Subsequent operation of the Emancipation Proclamation in 1863 Abolition of slavery by state action during the Civil War Operation of the Emancipation Proclamation in 1864 Operation of the Emancipation Proclamation in 1865 Thirteenth Amendment to the US constitution, 18 Dec 1865 Territory incorporated into the US after the passage of the Thirteenth Amendment

Abolishing slavery was not a Union war goal from the outset but quickly became one. Lincoln initially claimed that preserving the Union was the central goal. In contrast, the South fought to preserve slavery. While not all Southerners saw themselves as fighting for slavery, most officers and over a third of the rank and file in Lee's army had close family ties to slavery. To Northerners, the motivation was primarily to preserve the Union, not to abolish slavery.

However, as the war dragged on, and it became clear that slavery was central to the conflict, and that emancipation was, to quote the Emancipation Proclamation, "a fit and necessary war measure for suppressing [the] rebellion", Lincoln and his cabinet made ending slavery a war goal, culminating in the Emancipation Proclamation. Lincoln's decision to issue the Proclamation angered Peace Democrats ("Copperheads") and War Democrats, but energized most Republicans.

By warning that free blacks would flood the North, Democrats made gains in the 1862 elections, but they did not gain control of Congress. The Republicans' counterargument that slavery was the mainstay of the enemy steadily gained support, with the Democrats losing decisively in the 1863 elections in the Northern state of Ohio, when they tried to resurrect anti-black sentiment.

=== Emancipation Proclamation ===
The Emancipation Proclamation legally freed the slaves in states "in rebellion", but, as a practical matter, slavery for the 3.5 million black people in the South effectively ended in each area when Union armies arrived. The last Confederate slaves were freed on June 19, 1865, celebrated as the modern holiday of Juneteenth. Slaves in the border states and those in some former Confederate territory occupied before the Emancipation Proclamation were freed by state action or (on December 6, 1865) by the Thirteenth Amendment. The Emancipation Proclamation enabled African Americans, both free blacks and escaped slaves, to join the Union Army. About 190,000 volunteered, further enhancing the numerical advantage the Union armies enjoyed over the Confederates, who did not dare emulate the equivalent manpower source for fear of undermining the legitimacy of slavery. (Note: In spite of the South's shortage of soldiers, most Southern leaders—until 1865—opposed enlisting slaves. They used them as laborers to support the war effort. As Howell Cobb said, "If slaves will make good soldiers our whole theory of slavery is wrong." Confederate generals Patrick Cleburne and Robert E. Lee argued in favor of arming blacks late in the war, and Jefferson Davis was eventually persuaded to support plans for arming slaves to avoid military defeat. The Confederacy surrendered at Appomattox before this plan could be implemented.)

During the war, sentiment concerning slaves, enslavement, and emancipation in the United States was divided. Lincoln's fears of making slavery a war issue were based on a harsh reality: abolition did not enjoy wide support in the west, the territories, and the border states. (Note: Lincoln's letter to O. H. Browning, September 22, 1861.; Wittke 1952. "Sentiment among German Americans was largely antislavery especially among Forty-Eighters, resulting in hundreds of thousands of German Americans volunteering to fight for the Union."; Keller 2009.; for primary sources, see Walter D. Kamphoefner and Wolfgang Helbich, eds., Germans in the Civil War: The Letters They Wrote Home (2006). "On the other hand, many of the recent immigrants in the North viewed freed slaves as competition for scarce jobs, and as the reason why the Civil War was being fought."; Baker 2003. "Due in large part to this fierce competition with free blacks for labor opportunities, the poor and working class Irish Catholics generally opposed emancipation. When the draft began in the summer of 1863, they launched a major riot in New York City that was suppressed by the military, as well as much smaller protests in other cities."; Schecter 2006, ch. 6. "Many Catholics in the North had volunteered to fight in 1861, sending thousands of soldiers to the front and suffering high casualties, especially at Fredericksburg; their volunteering fell off after 1862.") In 1861, Lincoln worried that premature attempts at emancipation would mean the loss of the border states, and that "to lose Kentucky is nearly the same as to lose the whole game". Copperheads and some War Democrats opposed emancipation, although the latter eventually accepted it as part of the total war needed to save the Union.

Lincoln reversed attempts at emancipation by Secretary of War Simon Cameron and Generals John C. Frémont and David Hunter, in an effort to retain the loyalty of the border states and the War Democrats. Lincoln warned the border states that a more radical type of emancipation would happen if they rejected his plan of gradual compensated emancipation and voluntary colonization. But compensated emancipation occurred only in the District of Columbia, where Congress had the power to enact it. When Lincoln told his cabinet about his proposed emancipation proclamation, which would apply to the states still in rebellion on January 1, 1863, Seward advised Lincoln to wait for a Union military victory before issuing it, because to do otherwise would seem like "our last shriek on the retreat". Walter Stahr, however, writes, "There are contemporary sources, however, that suggest others were involved in the decision to delay", and Stahr quotes them.

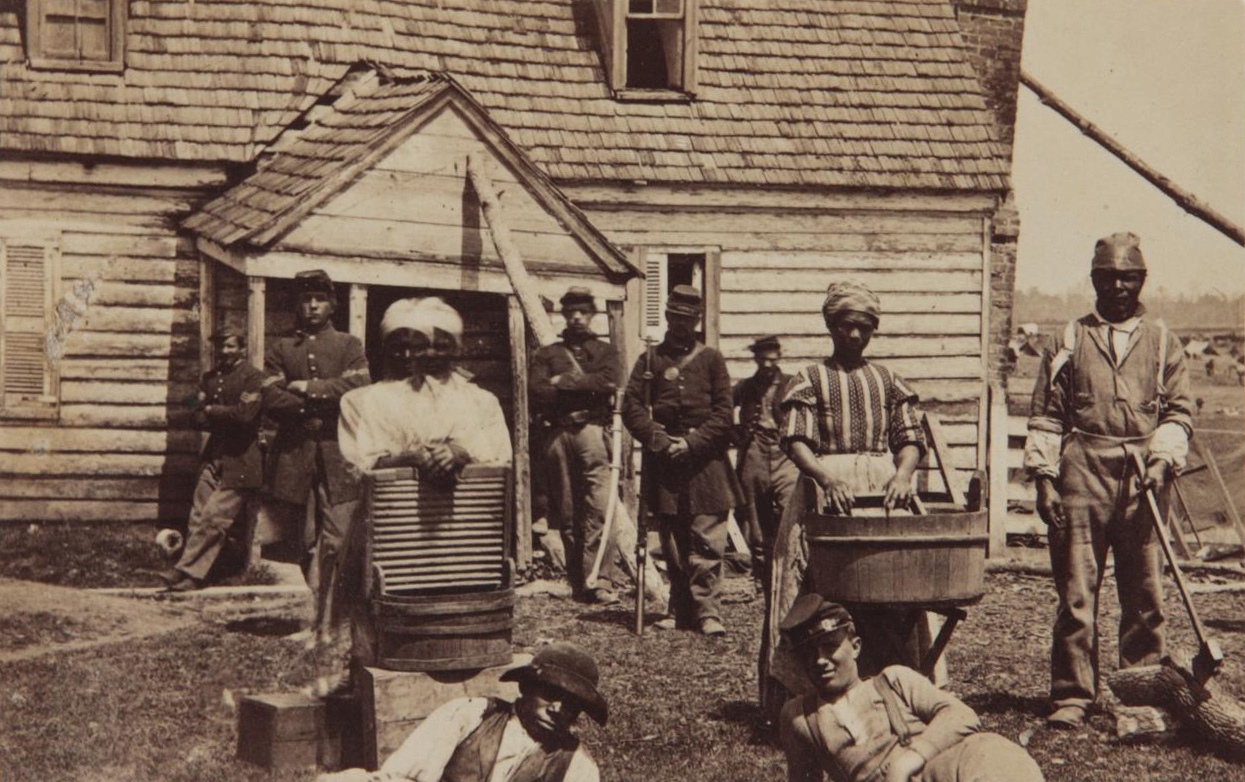
Contrabands, who were fugitive slaves, including cooks, laundresses, laborers, teamsters, railroad repair crews, fled to the Union Army, but were not legally freed until the Emancipation Proclamation, which Lincoln signed on January 1, 1863, more than two years before the end of the Civil War.

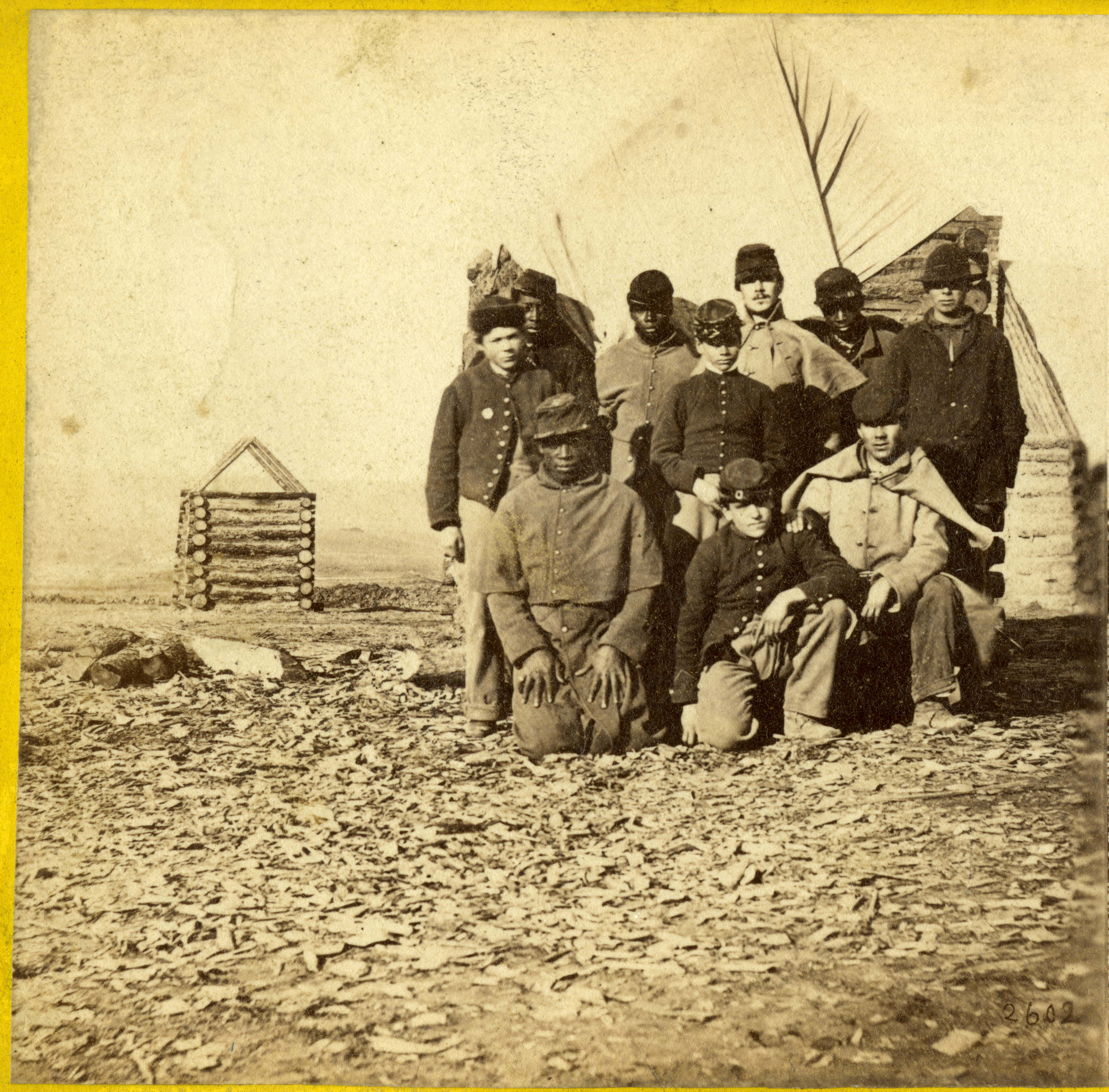
In 1863, the Union Army accepted Freedmen; seen here are black and white teenaged soldiers who volunteered to fight for the Union.

Lincoln laid the groundwork for public support in an open letter published in response to Horace Greeley's "The Prayer of Twenty Millions"; the letter stated that Lincoln's goal was to save the Union, and that, if he freed the slaves, it would be as a means to that end. He also had a meeting at the White House with five African American representatives on August 14, 1862. Arranging for a reporter to be present, he urged his visitors to agree to the voluntary colonization of black people.

Lincoln's motive for both his letter to Greeley and his statement to the black visitors was apparently to make his forthcoming Emancipation Proclamation more palatable to racist white people. A Union victory in the Battle of Antietam on September 17, 1862, provided Lincoln with an opportunity to issue the preliminary Emancipation Proclamation, and the War Governors' Conference added support for the proclamation.

Lincoln issued his preliminary Emancipation Proclamation on September 22, 1862. It stated that slaves in all states in rebellion on January 1, 1863, would be free. He issued his final Emancipation Proclamation on January 1, 1863, keeping his promise. In his letter to Albert G. Hodges, Lincoln explained his belief that "If slavery is not wrong, nothing is wrong.... And yet I have never understood that the Presidency conferred upon me an unrestricted right to act officially upon this judgment and feeling.... I claim not to have controlled events, but confess plainly that events have controlled me." (Note: In late March 1864 Lincoln met with Governor Bramlette, Archibald Dixon, and Albert G. Hodges, to discuss recruitment of African American soldiers in the state of Kentucky. In a letter dated April 4, 1864, Lincoln summarized his stance on slavery, at Hodges' request.)

Lincoln's moderate approach succeeded in inducing the border states to remain in the Union and War Democrats to support the Union. The border states, which included Kentucky, Missouri, Maryland, Delaware, and Union-controlled regions around New Orleans, Norfolk, Virginia, and elsewhere, were not covered by the Emancipation Proclamation. Nor was Tennessee, which had come under Union control.

Missouri and Maryland abolished slavery on their own. Kentucky and Delaware did not. Still, the proclamation did not enjoy universal support. It caused much unrest in what were then considered western states, where racist sentiments led to a great fear of abolition. There was some concern that the proclamation would lead to the secession of western states, and its issuance prompted the stationing of Union troops in Illinois in case of rebellion.

Since the Emancipation Proclamation was based on the president's war powers, it applied only in territory held by Confederates at the time it was issued. However, the Proclamation became a symbol of the Union's growing commitment to add emancipation to the Union's definition of liberty. The Emancipation Proclamation greatly reduced the Confederacy's hope of being recognized or otherwise aided by Britain or France. By late 1864, Lincoln was playing a leading role in getting the House of Representatives to vote for the Thirteenth Amendment, which mandated the ending of chattel slavery.

== Reconstruction ==
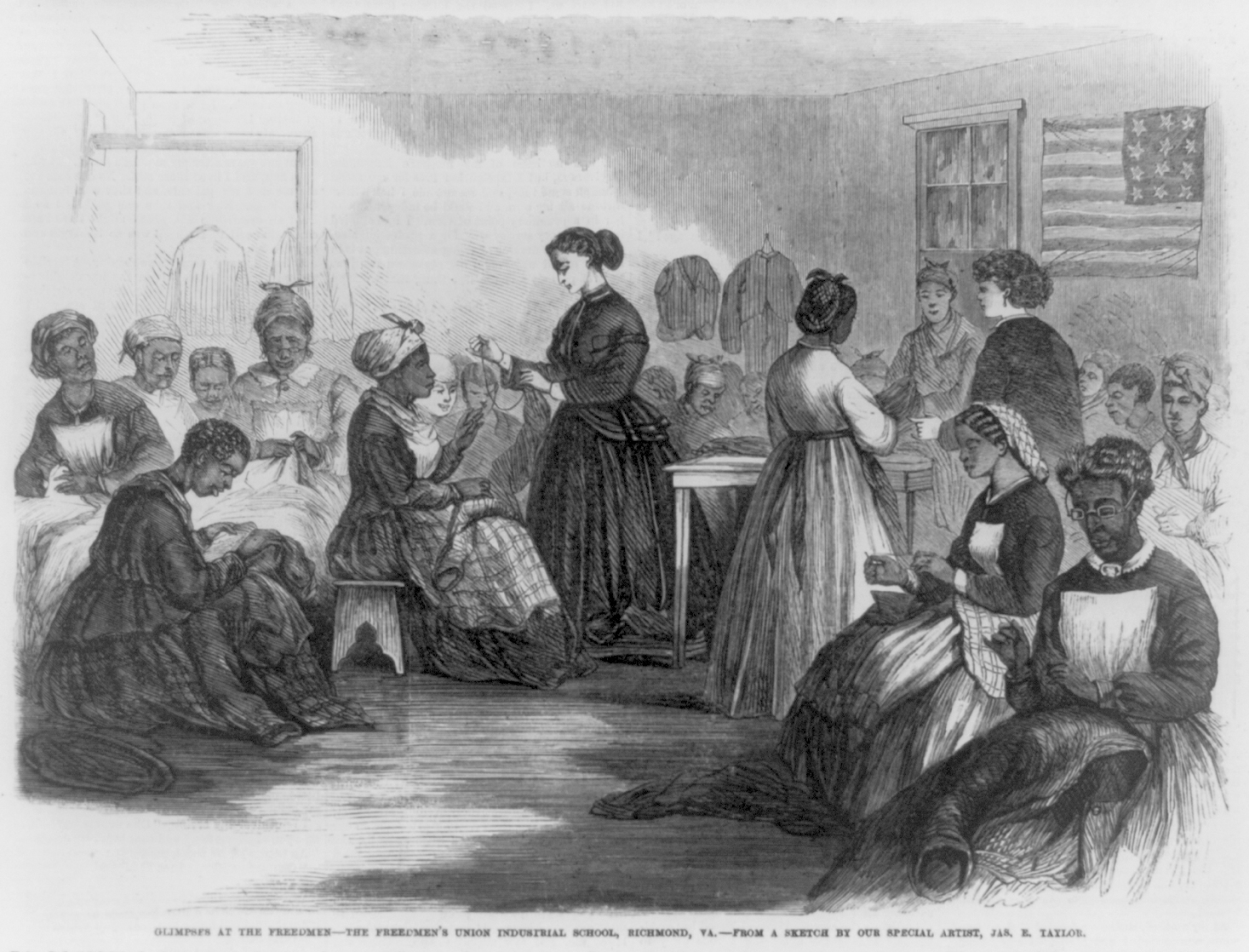
Through the supervision of the Freedmen's Bureau, Northern teachers traveled into the South to provide education and training for the newly freed population.

The war devastated the South and posed serious questions of how it would be reintegrated into the Union. The war destroyed much of the South's wealth, in part because wealth held in enslaved people (at least $1,000 each for a healthy adult prior to the war) was wiped off the books. All accumulated investment in Confederate bonds was forfeited; most banks and railroads were bankrupt. The income per person dropped to less than 40 percent of that of the North, and that lasted into the 20th century. Southern influence in the federal government, previously considerable, was greatly diminished until the second half of the 20th century. Reconstruction began during the war, with the Emancipation Proclamation of January 1863, and it continued until 1877. Its most important elements were the three "Reconstruction Amendments" to the Constitution: the thirteenth outlawing slavery (1865), the fourteenth guaranteeing birthright citizenship (including to former slaves), due process of law, and equal protection of the laws (1868), and the fifteenth prohibiting the denial of voting rights "on account of race, color, or previous condition of servitude" (1870). From the Union perspective, the goals of Reconstruction were to consolidate victory by reuniting the Union, to guarantee a "republican form of government" for the ex-Confederate states, and to permanently end slavery—and prevent semi-slavery status.

President Johnson, who took office in April 1865, took a lenient approach and saw the achievement of the main war goals as realized in 1865, when each ex-rebel state repudiated secession and ratified the Thirteenth Amendment. Radical Republicans demanded proof that Confederate nationalism was dead and that the slaves were truly free. They overrode Johnson's vetoes of civil rights legislation, and the House impeached him, although the Senate did not convict him. In 1868 and 1872, the Republican candidate Grant won the presidency.

In 1872, the "Liberal Republicans" argued that the war goals had been achieved and Reconstruction should end. They chose Horace Greeley to head a presidential ticket in 1872 but were decisively defeated. In 1874, Democrats, primarily Southern, took control of Congress and opposed further reconstruction. The Compromise of 1877 closed with a national consensus, except on the part of former slaves, that the war had finally ended. With the withdrawal of federal troops, white men retook control of every Southern legislature, and the Jim Crow era of disenfranchisement and legal segregation was ushered in.

The war had a demonstrable impact on American politics. Many veterans on both sides were elected to political office, including five US presidents: Ulysses Grant, Rutherford B. Hayes, James A. Garfield, Benjamin Harrison, and William McKinley.

== Memory and historiography ==
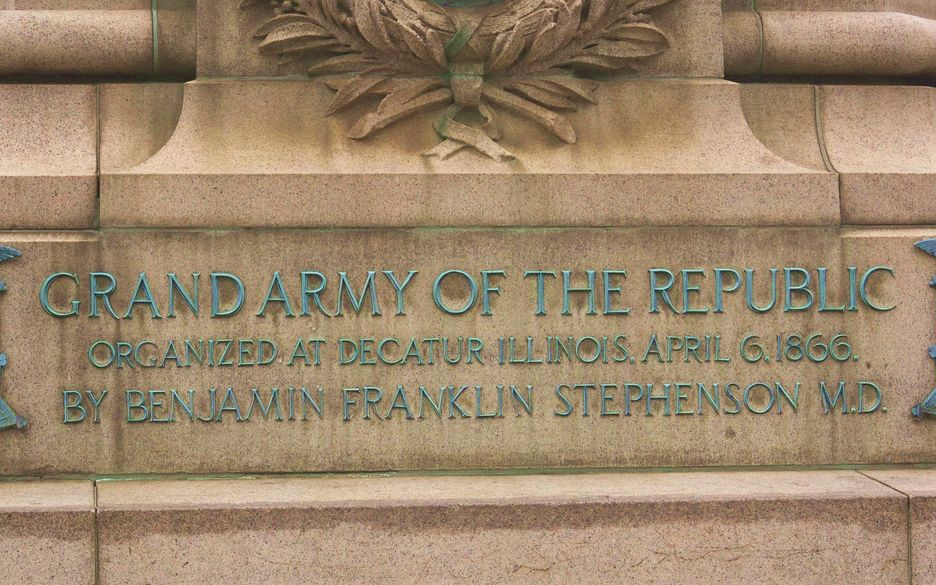
Monument to the Grand Army of the Republic, a Union veteran organization

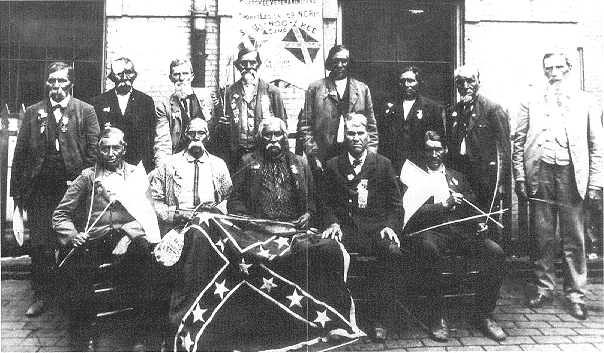
Cherokee Confederates reunion in New Orleans in 1903

The war is a central event in American collective memory. There are innumerable statues, commemorations, books, and archival collections. The memory includes the home front, military affairs, the treatment of soldiers, both living and dead, in the war's aftermath, depictions of the war in literature and art, evaluations of heroes and villains, and considerations of the moral and political lessons of the war. The last theme includes moral evaluations of racism and slavery, heroism and cowardice in combat and behind the lines, and issues of democracy and minority rights, as well as the notion of an "Empire of Liberty" influencing the world.

Historians have paid great attention to the causes of the war as well as to the war itself. Military history has developed outside as well as inside academia, leading to a proliferation of studies by non-scholars who nevertheless are familiar with the primary sources and pay close attention to battles and campaigns and who write for the general public. Practically every major figure in the war, both North and South, has had a serious biographical study.

Even the name used for the conflict has been controversial, with many names used for it. During and immediately after the war, Northern historians often used a term like "War of the Rebellion". Writers in rebel states often referred to the "War for Southern Independence". Some Southerners have described it as the "War of Northern Aggression".

=== Lost Cause ===
The memory of the war in the white South crystallized in the myth of the "Lost Cause": that the Confederate cause was just and heroic. The myth shaped regional identity and race relations for generations. Alan T. Nolan notes that the Lost Cause was expressly a rationalization, a cover-up to vindicate the name and fame of those in rebellion. Some claims revolve around the insignificance of slavery as a cause; some appeals highlight cultural differences between North and South; the military conflict by Confederate actors is idealized; in any case, secession was said to be lawful. Nolan argues that the adoption of the Lost Cause perspective facilitated the reunification of the North and the South while excusing the "virulent racism" of the 19th century, sacrificing black American progress to white man's reunification. He also deems the Lost Cause "a caricature of the truth. This caricature wholly misrepresents and distorts the facts of the matter" in every instance.

The Lost Cause myth was formalized by Charles A. Beard and Mary R. Beard, whose The Rise of American Civilization (1927) spawned Beardian historiography. The Beards downplayed slavery, abolitionism, and issues of morality. Though this interpretation was abandoned by the Beards in the 1940s, and by historians generally by the 1950s, Beardian themes still echo among Lost Cause writers.

=== Battlefield preservation ===
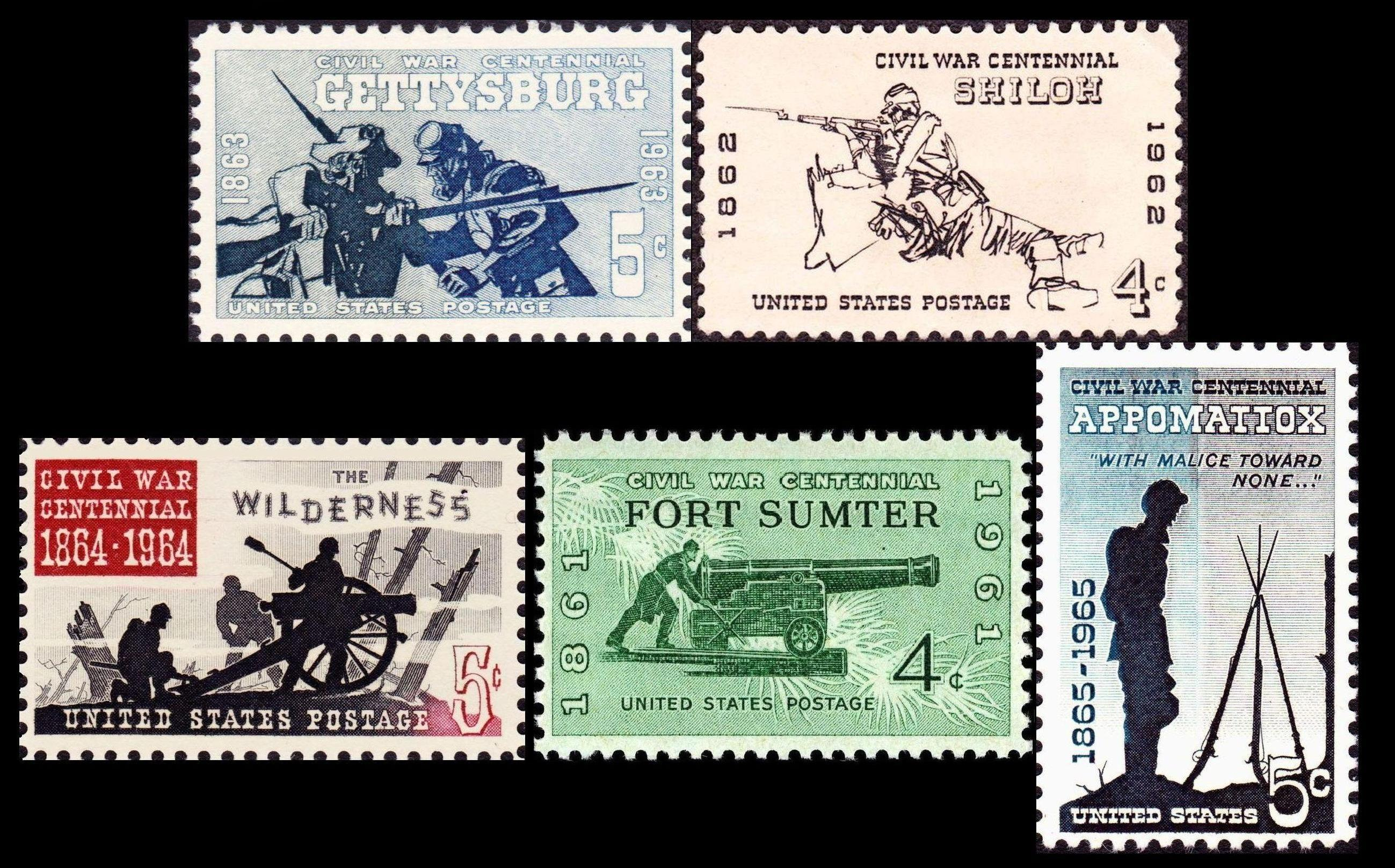
Beginning in 1961, the US Post Office released commemorative stamps for five famous battles, each issued on the 100th anniversary of the respective battle.

The first efforts at Civil War battlefield preservation and memorialization came during the war, with the establishment of National Cemeteries at Gettysburg, Mill Springs and Chattanooga. Soldiers began erecting markers on battlefields beginning with the First Battle of Bull Run in 1861. The oldest surviving monument is the Hazen Brigade Monument near Murfreesboro in Central Tennessee, built in the summer of 1863 by soldiers in Union Col. William B. Hazen's brigade to mark the spot where they buried their dead, following the Battle of Stones River.

In the 1890s, the government established five Civil War battlefield parks under the jurisdiction of the War Department, beginning with the creation of the Chickamauga and Chattanooga National Military Park at Fort Oglethorpe, Georgia, and the Antietam National Battlefield in Sharpsburg, Maryland, in 1890. The Shiloh National Military Park was established in 1894 in Shiloh, Tennessee, followed by the Gettysburg National Military Park in 1895, and Vicksburg National Military Park in 1899.

In 1933, these five parks and other national monuments were transferred to the National Park Service. Chief among modern efforts to preserve Civil War sites has been the American Battlefield Trust, with more than 130 battlefields in 24 states. The five major battlefield parks operated by the National Park Service had a combined 3 million visitors in 2018, down 70% from 10 million in 1970.

=== Commemoration ===
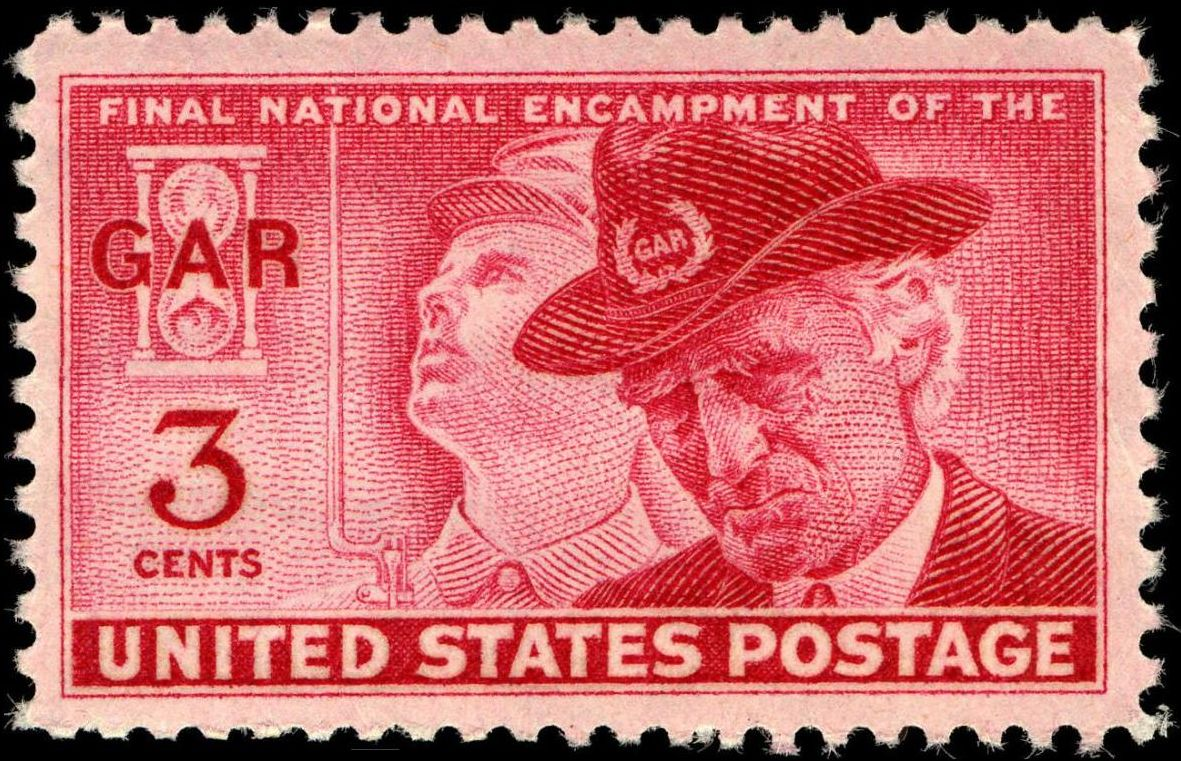
Grand Army of the Republic (Union)

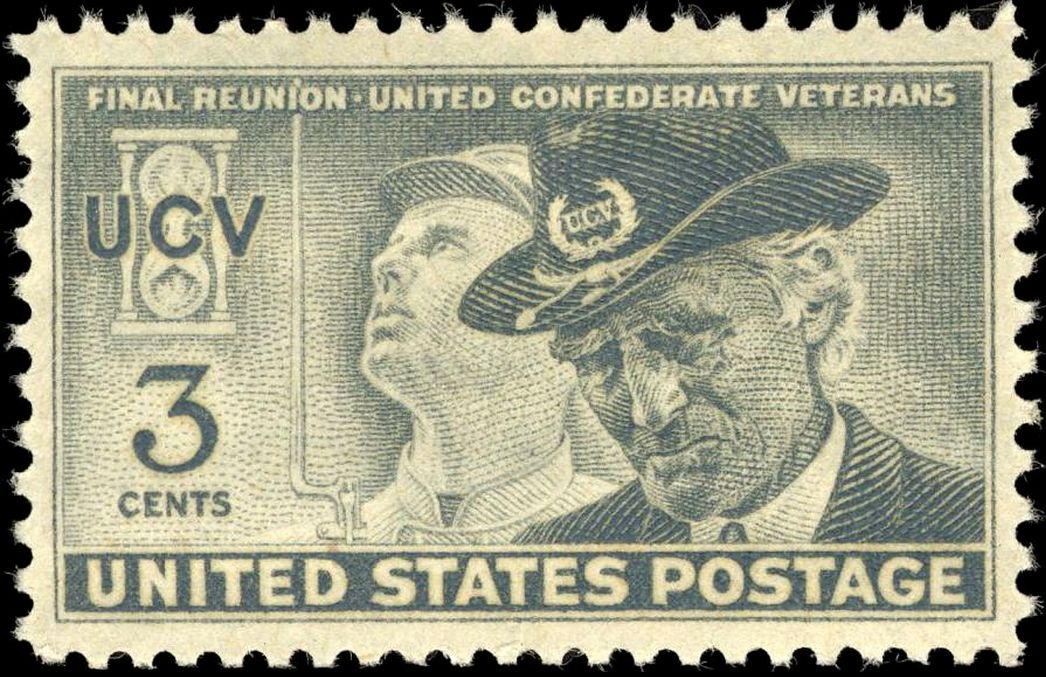
United Confederate Veterans

The Civil War has been commemorated in many ways, ranging from the reenactment of battles, to statues and memorial halls being erected, to films, and to stamps and coins with Civil War themes being issued, all of which helped to shape public memory. These commemorations occurred in greater numbers on the 100th and 150th anniversaries of the war. Hollywood's take on the war has been especially influential in shaping public memory, as in such film classics as The Birth of a Nation (1915), Gone with the Wind (1939), and Lincoln (2012). Ken Burns's PBS television series The Civil War (1990) is well-remembered, though criticized for its historical inaccuracy.

=== Technological significance ===
Technological innovations during the war had a great impact on 19th-century science. The war was an early example of an "industrial war", in which technological might is used to achieve military supremacy. New inventions, such as the train and telegraph, delivered soldiers, supplies and messages at a time when horses had been the fastest way to travel. It was also in this war that aerial warfare, in the form of reconnaissance balloons, was first used. It saw the first action involving steam-powered ironclad warships in naval warfare history.

Repeating firearms such as the Henry rifle, Spencer repeating rifle, Colt revolving rifle, Triplett & Scott carbine and others, first appeared during the Civil War; they were a revolutionary invention that would soon replace muzzle-loading and single-shot firearms. The war saw the first appearances of rapid-firing weapons and machine guns such as the Agar gun and Gatling gun.

== In works of culture and art ==
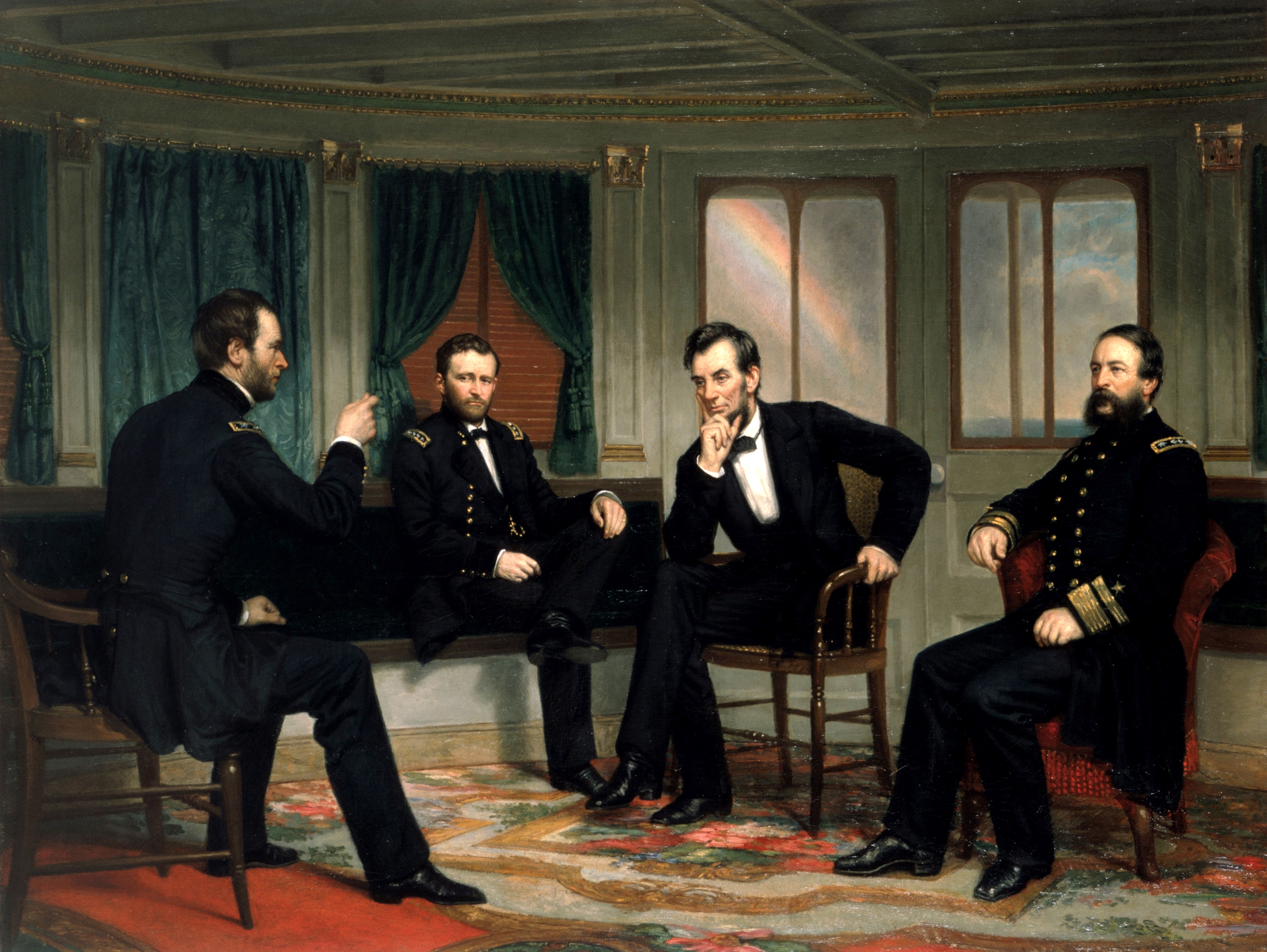
The Peacemakers by George Peter Alexander Healy portrays, from left to right, Sherman, Grant, Lincoln, and Porter discussing plans for the last weeks of the Civil War aboard the steamer River Queen in March 1865. It currently hangs in the Oval Office dining room.

The Civil War is one of the most studied events in American history, and the collection of cultural works around it is enormous. This section gives an abbreviated overview of the most notable works.

=== Literature ===
- When Lilacs Last in the Dooryard Bloom'd and O Captain! My Captain! (1865) by Walt Whitman, famous poetic eulogies to Lincoln
- Drum-Taps (1865), poetry by Walt Whitman, republished as Drum-Taps: The Complete 1865 Edition. New York Review Books (2015)
- Battle-Pieces and Aspects of the War (1866), poetry by Herman Melville
- The Rise and Fall of the Confederate Government (1881) by Jefferson Davis
- The Private History of a Campaign That Failed (1885) by Mark Twain
- Texar's Revenge, or, North Against South (1887) by Jules Verne
- An Occurrence at Owl Creek Bridge (1890) by Ambrose Bierce
- The Red Badge of Courage (1895) by Stephen Crane
- The Challenge to Sirius (1917) by Sheila Kaye-Smith
- Gone with the Wind (1936) by Margaret Mitchell
- North and South (1982) by John Jakes
- The March: A Novel (2005) by E. L. Doctorow, fictionalized account of Sherman's March to the Sea

=== Film ===
- The Birth of a Nation (1915, US)
- The General (1926, US)
- Operator 13 (1934, US)
- Gone with the Wind (1939, US)
- The Red Badge of Courage (1951, US)
- The Horse Soldiers (1959, US)
- Shenandoah (1965, US)
- The Good, the Bad and the Ugly (1966, Italy-Spain-FRG)
- The Beguiled (1971, US)
- The Outlaw Josey Wales (1976, US)
- North and South (miniseries; 1985–1994, US)
- Glory (1989, US)
- The Civil War (1990, US)
- Gettysburg (1993, US)
- The Last Outlaw (1993, US)
- Cold Mountain (2003, US)
- Gods and Generals (2003, US)
- Lincoln (2012, US)
- The Gettysburg Story (2013, US)
- Free State of Jones (2016, US)

=== Music ===
- "Dixie"
- "Battle Cry of Freedom"
- "Battle Hymn of the Republic"
- "The Bonnie Blue Flag"
- "John Brown's Body"
- "When Johnny Comes Marching Home"
- "Marching Through Georgia"
- "The Night They Drove Old Dixie Down"
- "O Captain! My Captain!", Walt Whitman's poem set to music by Kurt Weill
- "When Lilacs Last in the Dooryard Bloom'd", Walt Whitman's poem set to music by Paul Hindemith, by Roger Sessions, by Jennifer Higdon, and by Charles Villiers Stanford

=== Video games ===
- North & South (1989, France)
- Sid Meier's Gettysburg! (1997, US)
- Sid Meier's Antietam! (1999, US)
- American Conquest: Divided Nation (2006, US)
- Forge of Freedom: The American Civil War (2006, US)
- The History Channel: Civil War – A Nation Divided (2006, US)
- AGEOD's American Civil War (2007, US/France)
- History Civil War: Secret Missions (2008, US)
- Call of Juarez: Bound in Blood (2009, US)
- Darkest of Days (2009, US)
- Victoria II: A House Divided (2011, US)
- AGEOD's American Civil War II (2013, US/France)
- Ultimate General: Gettysburg (2014, Ukraine)
- Ultimate General: Civil War (2016, Ukraine)
- War of Rights (TBD, US)

== See also ==
- Foreign enlistment in the American Civil War
- African Americans in the American Civil War
- Asian Americans in the American Civil War
- German Americans in the American Civil War
- Hispanics in the American Civil War
- Irish Americans in the American Civil War
- Italian Americans in the Civil War
- American Indians in the American Civil War
  - Cherokee
  - Choctaw
- Outline of the American Civil War
- Union monuments and memorials
- Confederate monuments and memorials
- Removal of Confederate monuments and memorials
- List of wars involving the Confederate States of America
