= Home of a Rebel Sharpshooter =

1863 photograph by Timothy O'Sullivan

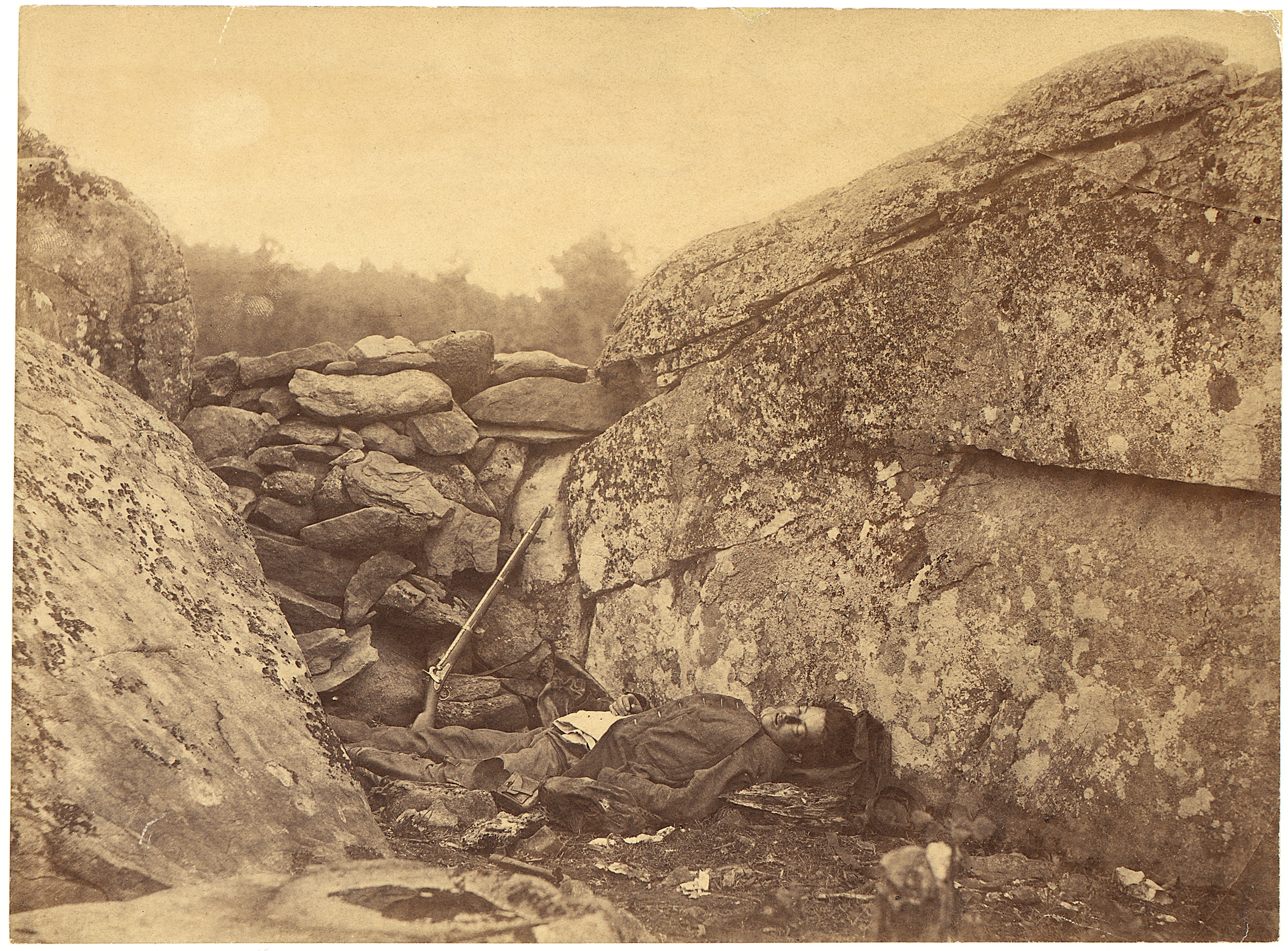
Home of a Rebel Sharpshooter

Home of a Rebel Sharpshooter is a staged war photograph taken by Timothy O'Sullivan, assistant to Alexander Gardner, after the Battle of Gettysburg in July 1863. Gardner published the photograph in Gardner's Photographic Sketch Book of the Civil War after the war, claiming that the subject was a Confederate sharpshooter who had been mortally wounded by a shell fragment during the battle. In 1961, it was suggested in a magazine article that the photograph had been staged, with the corpse appearing in other photographs taken by the Gardner team in another location on the battlefield. This was discussed more thoroughly in 1975 by photographic historian William A. Frassanito, who demonstrated that the photograph was one of six taken of the same body, which had originally been located on the south edge of the Devil's Den before being moved next to a stone wall within the Devil's Den area. The rifle is not that of a sharpshooter and was likely a prop, and the corpse was likely not a sharpshooter at all. Attempts have been made to identify the subject of the photograph.

== Subject ==
Home of a Rebel Sharpshooter depicts a dead Confederate soldier killed at the Battle of Gettysburg. It is part of a series of photographs taken by Alexander Gardner and Timothy O'Sullivan at and near a feature on the battlefield known as the Devil's Den. It was taken using the cumbersome wet plate process. The soldier is in what the Library of Congress refers to as a "rocky niche", in front of a stone wall which the photographic historian William A. Frassanito states is a stone wall built by Confederate soldiers during the battle. (Note: This has since been rebuilt by the National Park Service.) Part of Little Round Top is visible in the background. The soldier's head rests on a knapsack, and a rifle is visible against the wall. A stereoview taken by O'Sullivan of the same scene shows a blanket under the body. The Battle of Gettysburg was fought from July 1 to 3, 1863, and a number of photographers took pictures of the field in the days after the battle. Gardner was a former photographic assistant of Mathew Brady who had started his own company earlier in 1863; in the previous September he had taken photographs of corpses after the Battle of Antietam. Gardner arrived at the Gettysburg battlefield on July 5, although it is possible that some of his assistants had arrived the previous day. Home of a Rebel Sharpshooter was photographed on July 6. By the time the photograph was taken, it is likely that most of the corpses on the battlefield had already been buried. Gardner later claimed to have taken the photograph himself, but one of Gardner's sales catalogs published only months after the battle listed O'Sullivan as the photographer; Frassanito attributes the image to O'Sullivan. Frassanito describes it as "one of the most memorable of all Gettysburg photographs". The Encyclopedia of Virginia describes it as "one of the iconic images of the war", and the National Park Service describes it as "one of the most recognizable images of the Civil War".

== Analysis ==
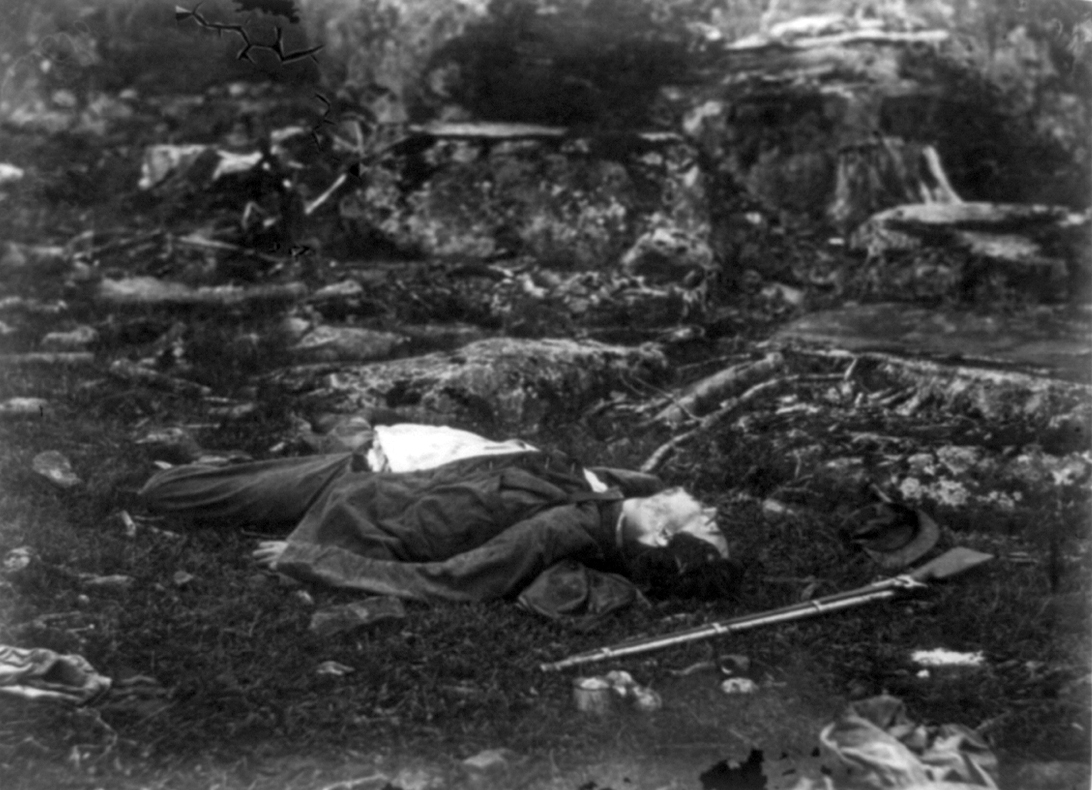
A Sharpshooter's Last Sleep, one of the views of the same corpse in the original location.

The photograph was included in Gardner's Photographic Sketch Book of the War, which was published in 1865 and 1866; after the war had ended. Gardner's caption for the photograph presented the body as that of a Confederate sharpshooter who had been mortally wounded by a shell fragment during the battle. It further claimed that the photographer had returned in November, finding the skeletonized body and rusted rifle in the same place. Frassanito notes that this particular claim is not plausible, as the corpse and rifle would have been removed by burial parties and battlefield scavengers, respectively, long before November. The caption contained further invented elements, describing how the soldier lay down to die after his wound. A 1961 magazine article first proposed that the corpse had been moved from elsewhere on the battlefield and photographed in multiple locations. Frassanito further expounded upon this theory in 1975. The corpse, according to Frassanito, was originally located on the southern edge of the Devil's Den, near a large rock. Three photographs were taken by the Gardner team in this area, with one pointing towards Little Round Top (which was blocked from view by the Devil's Den) and another with part of the Slaughter Pen area in the background. The corpse was then moved, (Note: A 2018 article by Scott Fink published in the Civil War Times notes that in 1998, the Maryland artist James Grove presented an argument, based upon a postwar recollection by a Union artillery officer, that the body had originally been located in the sharpshooter niche and was then moved elsewhere. However, Fink notes that the postwar account had likely been influenced by the widely-known photograph and Gardner's caption, and states that "some of Groves' key points have been disproved".) most likely by the photographers without assistance from a burial party, and then staged by the stone wall. The blanket visible in the O'Sullivan stereo view might have been used to transport the body. The rifle in the background of the photograph was not one that would have been used by sharpshooters and it is visible in other Gardner Gettysburg photographs, so it was likely a weapon that Gardner was using as a prop. The corpse is likely that of a regular infantryman, not a sharpshooter. While Brady's Gettysburg corpse photographs were of live assistants pretending to be dead (Brady arrived at Gettysburg later and the burial process was complete by then), the alleged sharpshooter is clearly a corpse due to signs of decomposition in the face and hands. Frassanito believes that the series of images would have taken roughly an hour to complete; he suggests that the amount of time spent photographing this single body indicates that there were few other corpses remaining on the field.

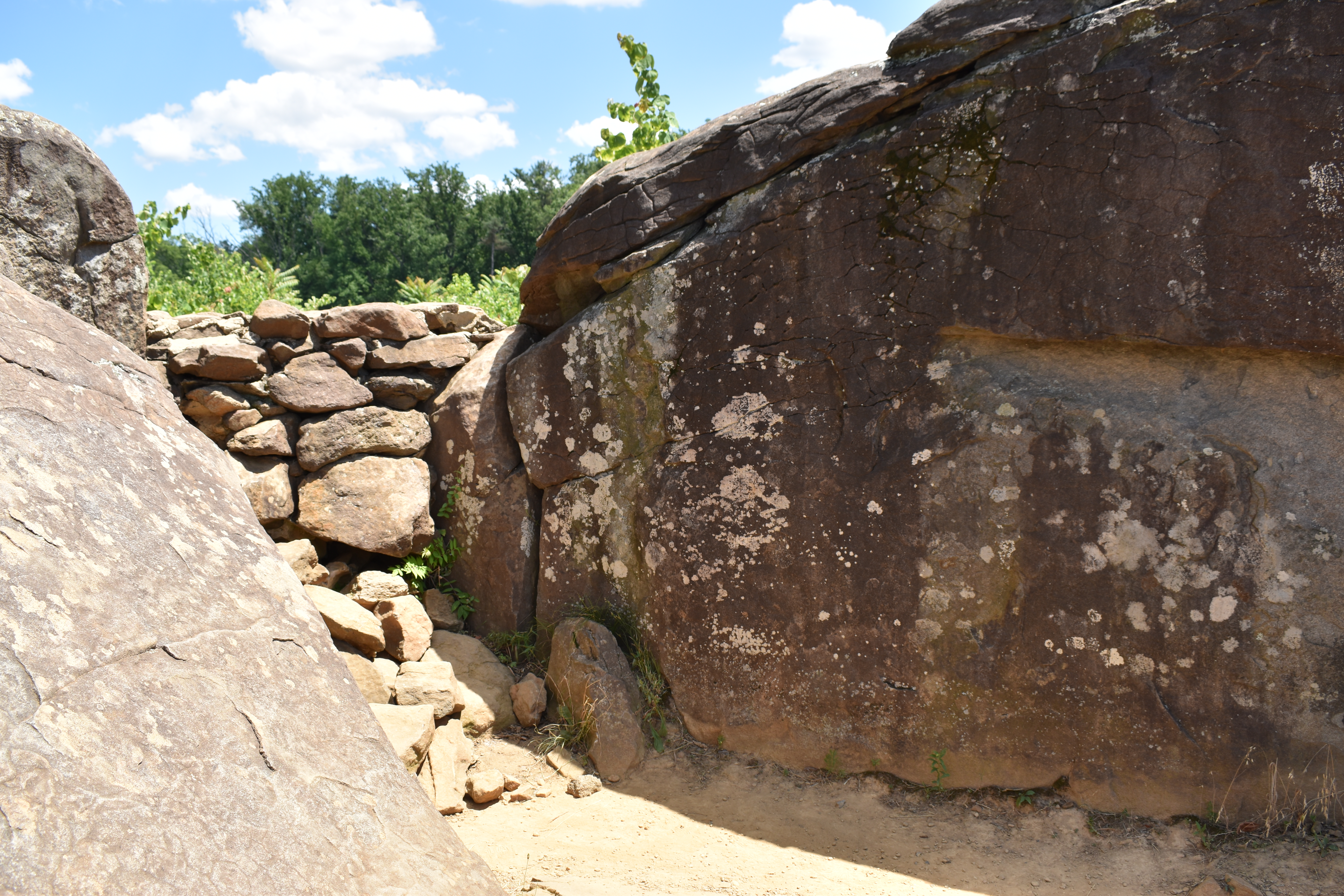
The location of the photograph, as seen in July 2020.

Gardner's principal focus with his Gettysburg photographs was, as Jonathan Snyder writes in an article in War, Literature & the Arts, "recording the horrors of war". Aware that when his photographs were marketed, his audience would respond emotionally to photographs of corpses, he sought to take photographs that cause those emotional reactions. Snyder believes that Gardner's desire to document war's horrors led him to "take certain liberties" with his photographs. Gardner's views of Confederate dead consistently portrayed them as traitors to the United States (Union), with the caption he wrote for A Harvest of Death describing fallen Confederates as having been killed while fighting "an army of patriots". Frassanito describes the decision to stage the corpse as occurring "in what must have been a flash of creative excitement". Harrion Dietzman, writing for Configurations, describes Home of a Rebel Sharpshooter and one of the views of the same corpse in the other location (A Sharpshooter's Last Sleep) as the only two "intimate individual portraits" published in the Sketch Book.

In 1911, the family of Confederate soldier Andrew Hoge claimed he was the dead soldier; a 2018 article published in the Civil War Times by Scott Fink notes that a photograph of Hoge shows some facial similarities to the supposed sharpshooter, and that a mention to a canteen in one of Gardner's draft captions could be related to a story about a family member leaving a canteen by Hoge's body when he was killed. However, Frassanito's book Early Photography at Gettysburg concludes that this identification is not plausible, as Hoge's unit, the 4th Virginia Infantry Regiment, did not fight near Devil's Den. Frassanito, in Gettysburg: A Journey in Time speculates that the dead soldier was likely a member of the 1st Texas Infantry Regiment or the 17th Georgia Infantry Regiment. 2014 research National Park Service historian John Heiser came to the conclusion that the soldier was most likely a member of Henry L. Benning's Georgia brigade. Fink and Heiser both believe that the soldier was killed on July 3, although heavier fighting had taken place in the area on the previous day, as Confederate soldiers occupying the area on July 3 would have buried as many of their fallen comrades as possible. After researching Confederate soldiers who were killed in the area on July 3, and noting facial resemblances in a known photograph, Fink suggested the fallen soldier may have been John Rutherford Ash of the 2nd Georgia Infantry Regiment. Heiser further notes that the numeral 2 may be visible on the dead soldier's knapsack.

== See also ==
- List of photographs considered the most important

== Sources ==
- Dietzman, Harrison (2017). "Moulder[ing] Into Nothingness Among the Rocks: Sharpshooters in Gardner's Photographic Sketch Book of the Civil War". Configurations. 25 (4): 447–473. doi:10.1353/con.2017.0028.
- Frassanito, William A. (1975). Gettysburg: A Journey in Time. New York City: Charles Scribner's Sons. ISBN 0-684-14696-7.
- Snyder, Jonathan (2014). "The "Make-Believe" War: Necessary Fictionalization in Alexander Gardner's Photographic Sketch Book of the Civil War". War, Literature & the Arts. 26: 1–23.
