= A Harvest of Death =

1863 photograph by Timothy H. O'Sullivan

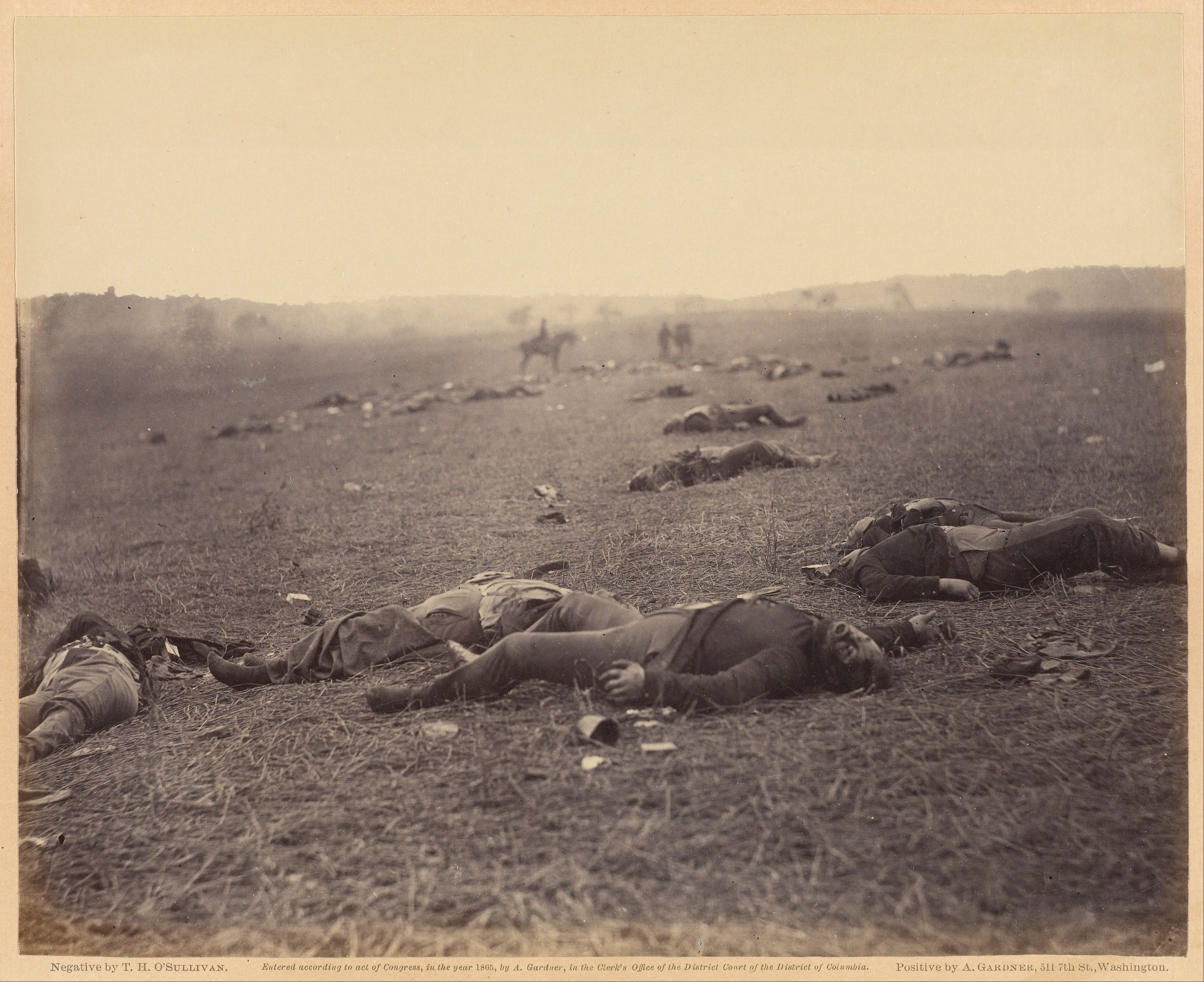
A Harvest of Death, a photograph following the Battle of Gettysburg, taken in early July 1863

A Harvest of Death is the title of a photograph taken by Timothy H. O'Sullivan, sometime between July 4 and 7, 1863. It shows the bodies of Union soldiers killed at the Battle of Gettysburg during the American Civil War, stretched out over part of the battlefield.

It is the result of a singular photographic project undertaken by entrepreneur Mathew Brady, who wished to give a realistic account of the conflict. However, when Timothy O'Sullivan photographed the aftermath of the Battle of Gettysburg, the deadliest engagement of the Civil War, he had recently distanced himself from his sponsor, like another employer of Brady's, Alexander Gardner with whom O'Sullivan worked together from then on.

The photograph has given rise to a variety of analyses and interpretations, focusing on the realism of the image, the use of staging, and the representation of violence and corpses.

The Gettysburg Address, delivered by President Lincoln four months after the battle, contributed to the notoriety of the photograph. Despite the commercial failure of the photographers, the photograph gradually achieved celebrity and even status as a symbol of the Civil War, and as such was both celebrated and criticized.

The cover of the album published in 1865

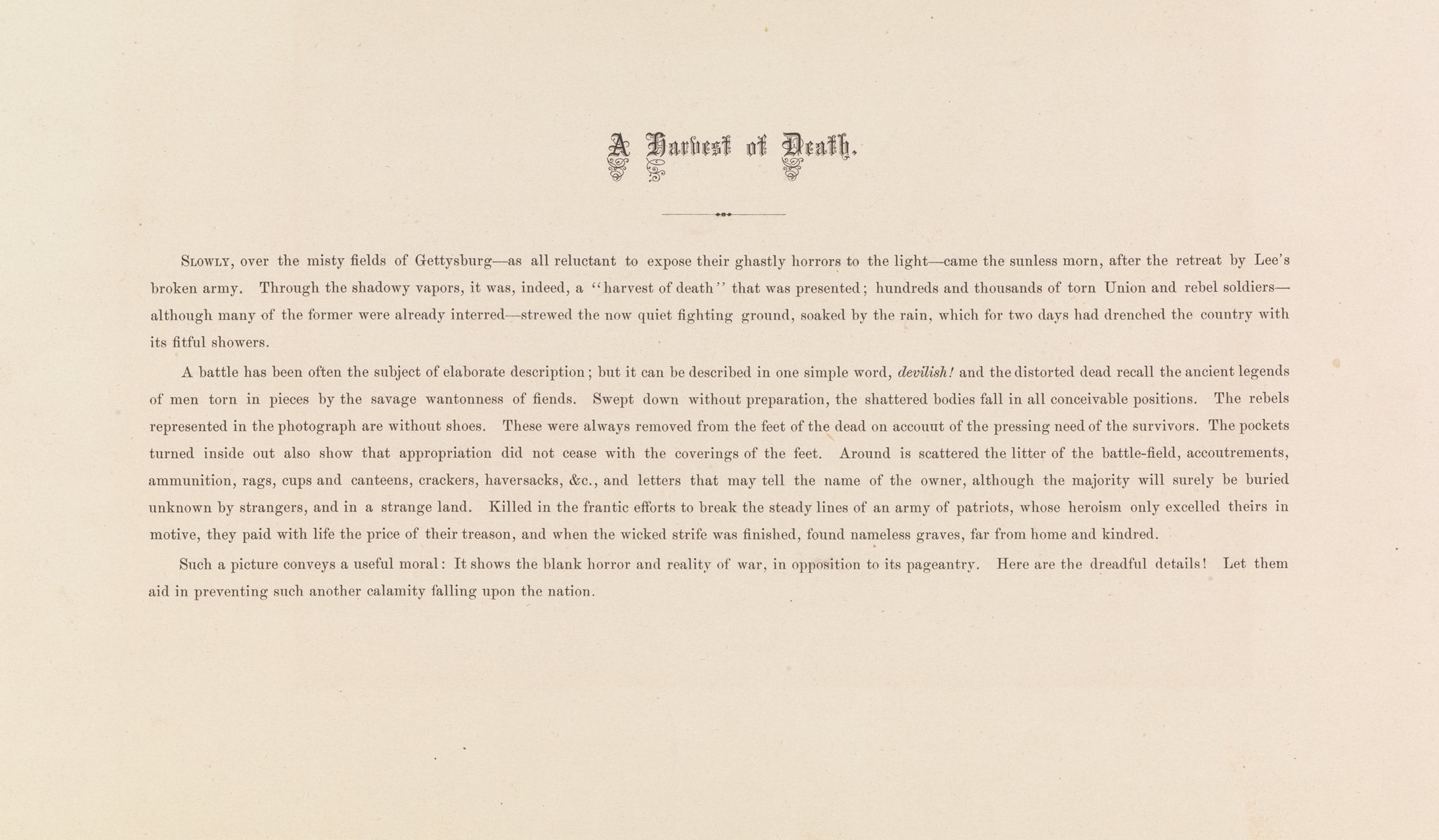
Photograph title and caption by Alexander Gardner

== Description ==
The collodion glass negative, a wet-plate process, was taken by Timothy O’Sullivan in the first week of July 1863 in the fields of Gettysburg, Pennsylvania, where the battle had taken place. The albumen prints for publication were made by O’Sullivan's partner Alexander Gardner. Like most of the original photographs printed it measures 45.2 × 57.2 cm (17.8 x 22.5 inches). The image shows decomposing corpses lying scattered on a plain field. It is one of the most famous representations of the American Civil War. Published in the first American anthology of photographs, Gardner's Photographic Sketch Book of the War, in 1865, it is part of the album's series of ten photographic plates of the Battle of Gettysburg, eight of which were taken by Timothy H. O'Sullivan.

The composition of the image shows a foreground of grassy meadow, immediately interrupted by a horizontal line of corpses. The swollen corpses have been stripped of their shoes, and one still has its mouth wide open. The corpses accumulate in the center of the image, the perspective framed by mist or smoke making it impossible for the viewer to distinguish or count them. Two men with horses stand in the blurred distance of the field in the center of the picture's background. The indistinct vanishing point indicates the unmeasurable expanse of the battlefield and, consequently, the scale of this "harvest of death".

The photograph is accompanied by a lengthy caption that reads as follows:

Slowly, over the misty fields of Gettysburg—as if all reluctant to expose their ghastly horrors to the light—came the sunless morn, after the retreat by Lee's broken army. Through the shadowy vapors, it was, indeed, a "harvest of death" that was presented. Hundreds and thousands of torn Union and rebel soldiers—although many of the former were already interred—strewed the now quiet ground, soaked by the rain, which for two days had drenched the country with its fitful showers [...] Such a picture conveys a useful moral: It shows the blank horror and reality of war, in opposition to its pageantry. Here are the dreadful details! Let them aid in preventing such another calamity falling upon the nation.

== Context ==
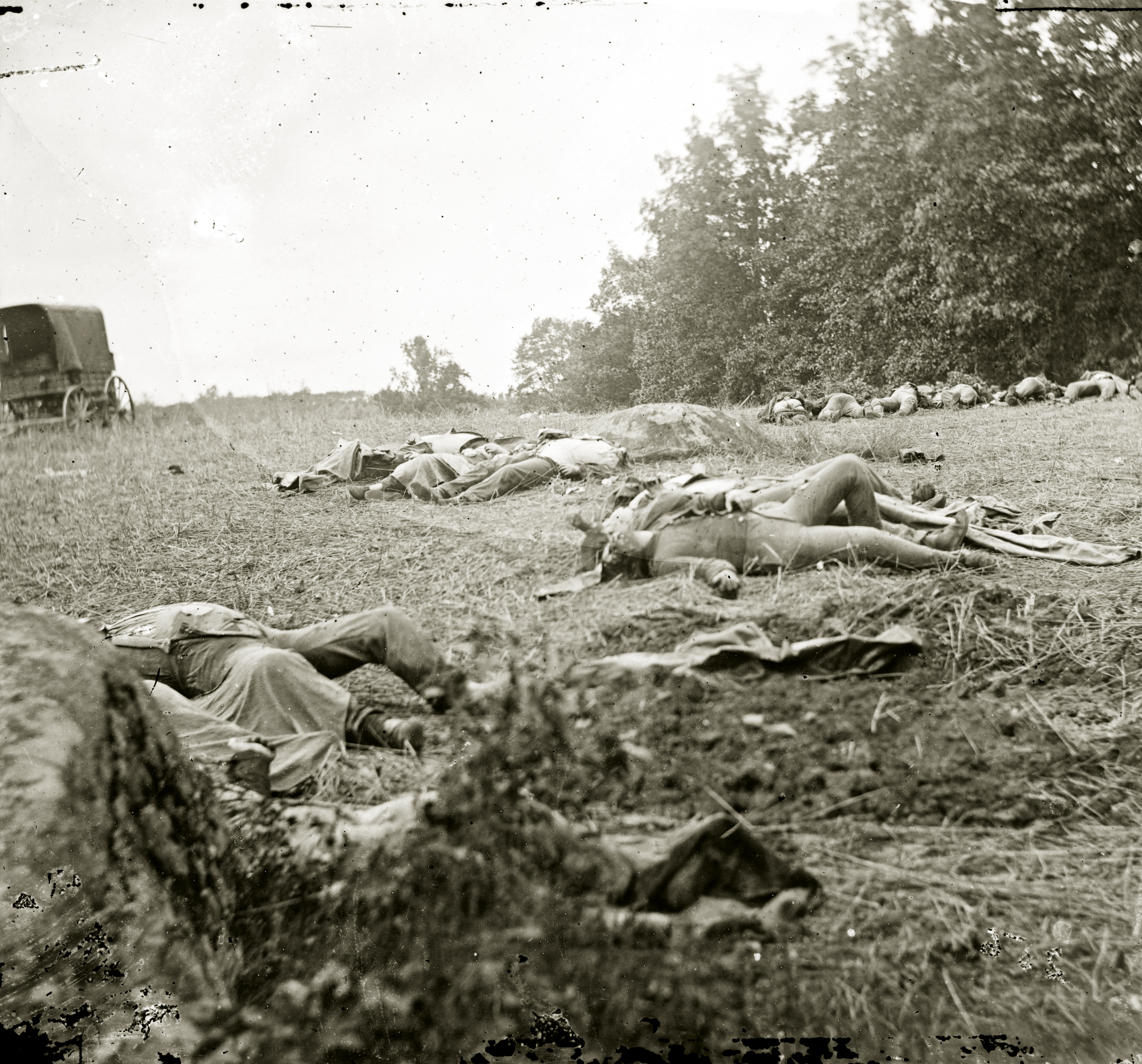
Alexander Gardner, Confederate dead gathered for burial at the southwestern edge of the Rose woods, July 5, 1863, Library of Congress.

=== Technique ===
During the American Civil War, glass plates were exposed to wet collodion for five to twenty seconds, and had to be developed quickly after exposure. These constraints meant that a lot of equipment had to be transported to the shooting location in a cart. O'Sullivan's equipment appears incidentally in the far left of the photograph Confederate dead gathered for burial at the southwestern edge of the Rose woods, on the Gettysburg battlefield. The shot is taken as the soldiers' corpses begin their decomposition process, and the thousands of slaughtered horses are piled and burned nearby.

The photographic technique did not yet allow to capture the action or the moment—which is what cartoonists could do—nor did photography offer a synthesis like history painting.

=== Photographic project ===
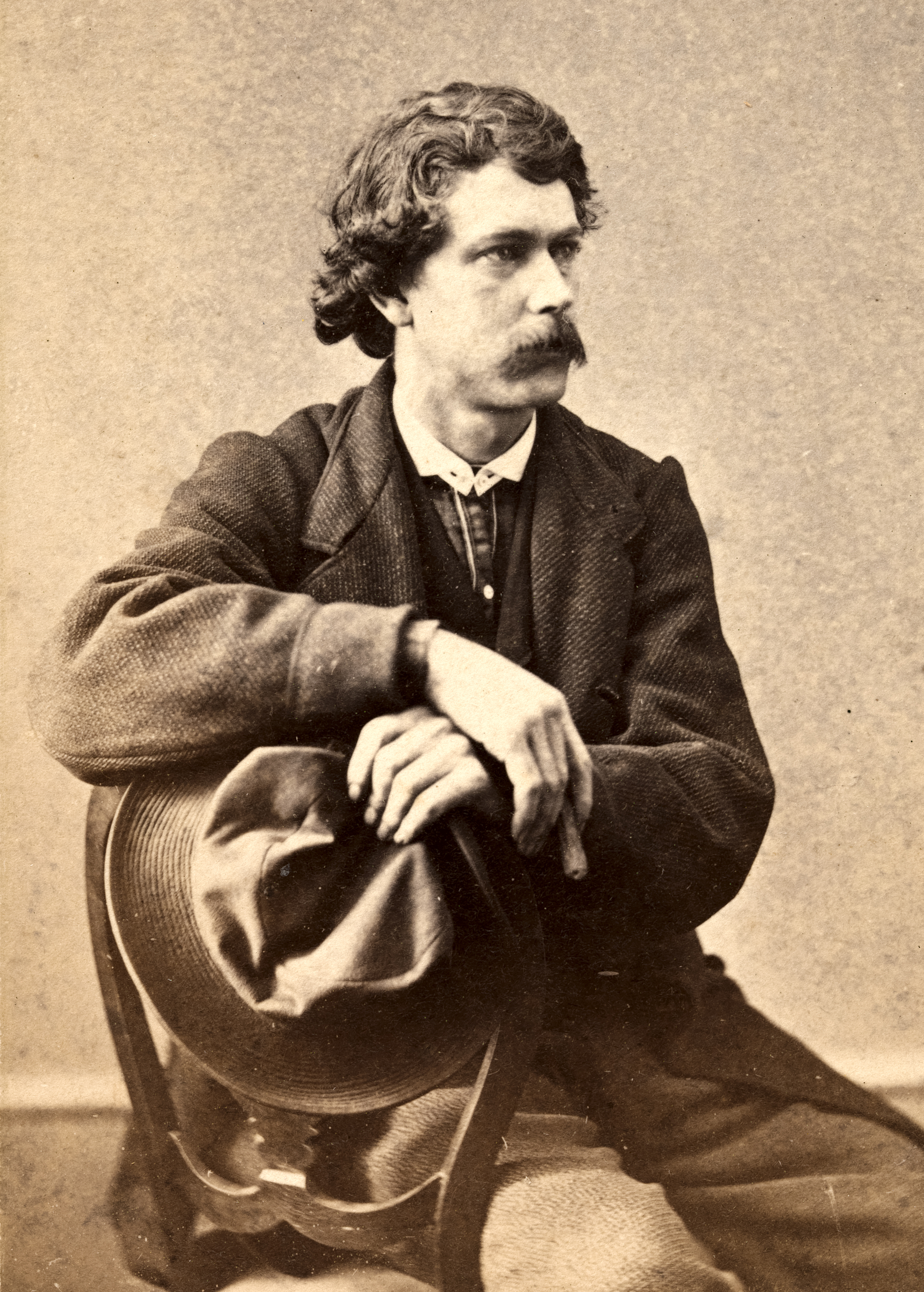
Portrait of Timothy H.O'Sullivan by Philp & Solomons, circa 1870.

O'Sullivan's biography is incomplete. As a teenager, he was recruited by Mathew Brady, a photographer and portraitist also known for his Civil War photographs. When the war began in 1861, he was most likely commissioned as a first lieutenant in the Union army. Alexander Gardner worked as a staff photographer for General George B. McClellan, commander of the Army of the Potomac. O'Sullivan became a photographer attached to the topographical engineers, copying maps and plans and taking photographs in his spare time. He and Gardner followed the Union forces from November 1861 to April 1862.

For American essayist and novelist Susan Sontag, O'Sullivan's photography is part of "the first large-scale attempt to document a war". Northern photographers Alexander Gardner and Timothy O'Sullivan collected for their employer Mathew Brady "conventional subjects, such as encampments populated by officers and infantrymen, towns on the warpath, munitions, ships", but above all dead Union and Confederate soldiers lying on the scorched ground of Gettysburg and Antietam. Access to the battlefield was a privilege granted to Brady and his team by Lincoln himself, but that did not mean the photographers were commissioned.

Brady proved to be an authoritarian boss: although he assembled 26 photographers to document the entire front, several of them, including Gardner and O'Sullivan, left the group in 1863 and formed their own teams, due to Brady's desire to take full credit for the expedition.

Photographer Sophie Delaporte links Mathew Brady's work to that of Roger Fenton in the Crimean War. For film historian Jérôme Bimbenet, on the other hand, Brady, Gardner and O'Sullivan's expedition is clearly different: "Unlike the Crimean War, where images were censored in advance because most of the photographers were on assignment on behalf of the government, the American Civil War was covered by a majority of private photographers whose aim was to commercialize the photographs".

=== Battle of Gettysburg ===
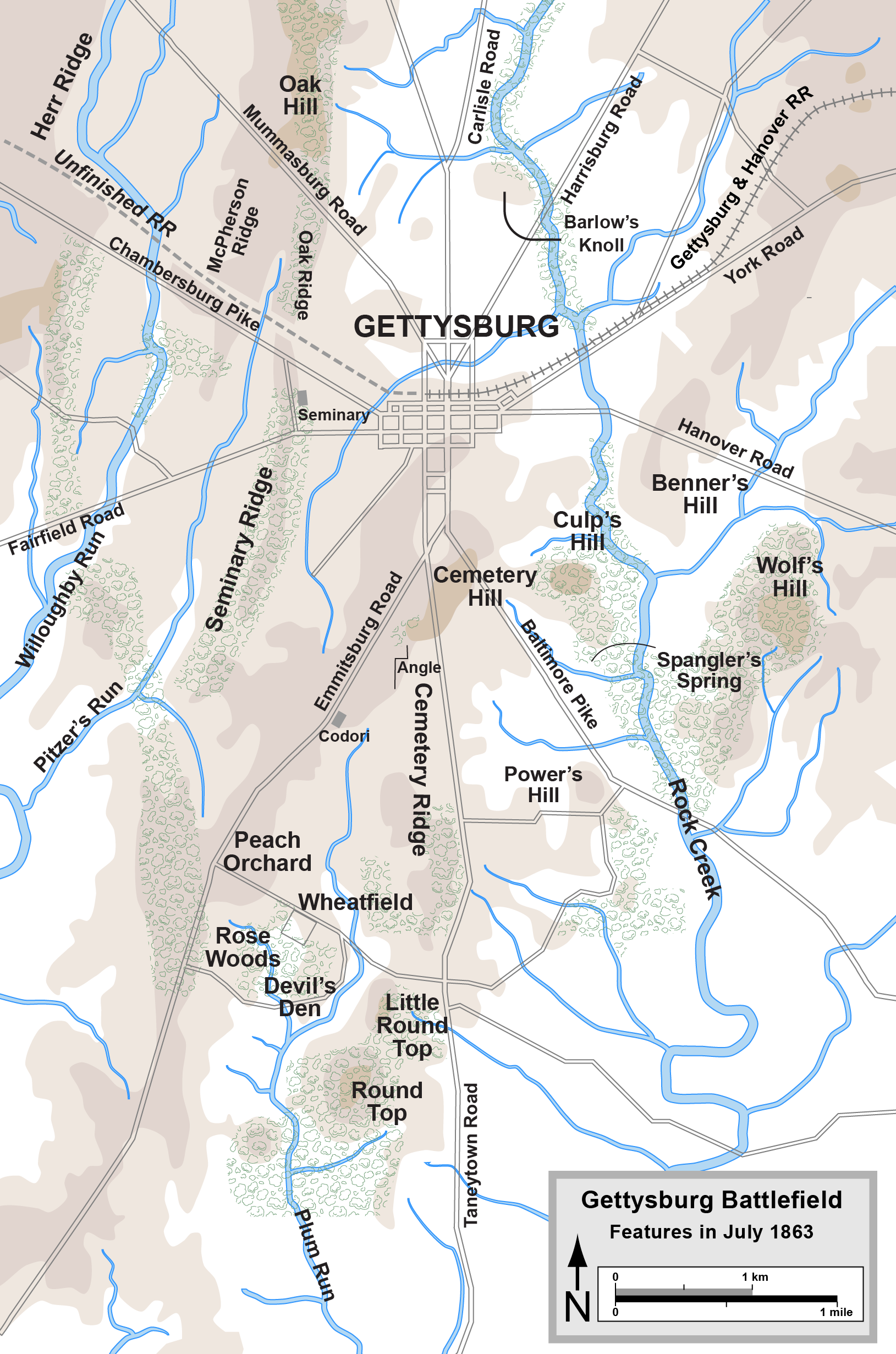
Map of Gettysburg in July, 1863.

The Battle of Gettysburg, which took place between July 1–3, 1863 at Gettysburg, Pennsylvania, ended in defeat for the Confederates, who lost the battlefield to the Unionists. Often regarded as the main turning point in the war, it was also the Civil War battle with the highest military losses: 28,000 men for the Confederates, 23,000 for the Unionists, well over a quarter of the total number of troops involved. For historian John Keegan, landscape and wooded terrain were the main factors behind this excess mortality, "as troops met by surprise, in a context of poor visibility, and found it difficult to disengage because of the dense vegetation." The good position of the Unionists, entrenched on the heights and heavily armed, left little chance for Confederate assaults.

It marked the failure of the offensive of the Army of Northern Virginia, commanded by General Lee, against General Meade's Army of the Potomac, and put an end to the invasion by Confederate troops of territories controlled by the Union.

== Analysis and interpretation ==
=== Realism and history ===
For Brady, photography is a moral duty: "the camera is the eye of history", he says. The demand for realism allows, if not requires, the showing of unpleasant and harsh facts. Thus, "at the outbreak of war, the American photographer's ambition is to record the history of the United States, focusing in particular on the daily lives of those involved in the conflict, from the general to the common soldier: he shows individuals above all, while erasing hierarchies." Because he financed his venture alone, Brady also hoped to make a considerable amount of money. For film historian Jérôme Bimbenet, it was probably the private initiative that enabled O'Sullivan's images to be both realistic and innovative - unlike under government commissioned work.

However, photographers didn't necessarily photograph their subjects as they found them. Photography remains a work of composition. With living subjects, one adopts a pose; with immobile corpses, as Susan Sontag points out, the photographer remains the one who arranges the elements in the image. Similarly, André Kaspi, an expert on the United States history, points out that to attract buyers of photographs, the Civil War photographer becomes a director, resorting to trickery.

=== Staging ===
Through staging, photography becomes an element that can be manipulated for aesthetic, commercial or propagandistic purposes.

A Harvest of Death and Field where General Reynolds fell are plates 36 and 37 in the Photographic Sketch Book of the War, published in 1865. Their subject matter appears to be different: "The commentary on the first photograph describes rebel soldiers, who died attacking a patriot army and were abandoned on the battlefield. The second describes Union soldiers who died doing their duty." However, American historian William Frassanito was able to demonstrate that it was a single scene, taken from two different angles by Timothy O'Sullivan.

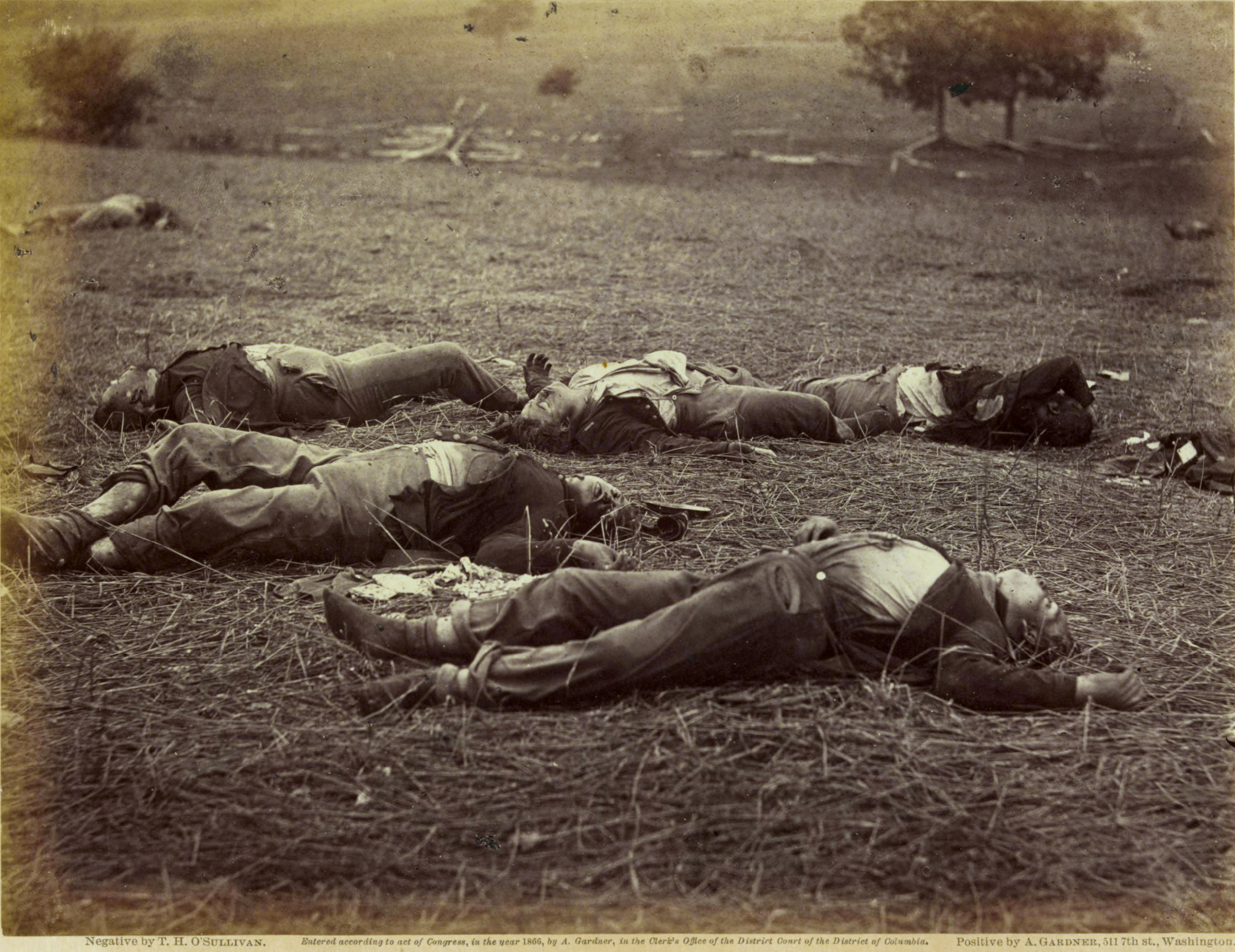
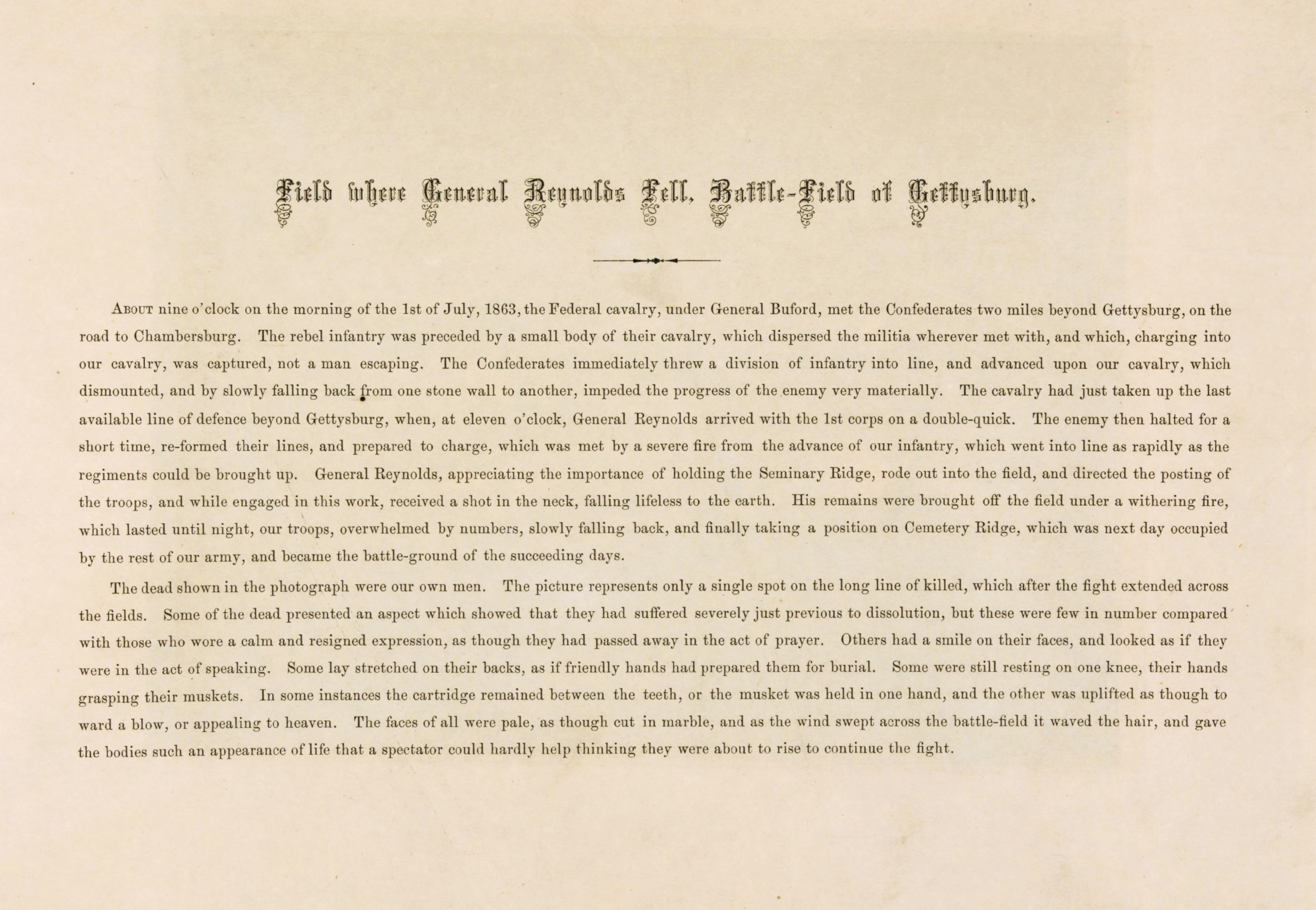
Plate entitled Field Where General Reynolds Fell from Gardner's collection, immediately following that entitled A Harvest of Death, and corresponding caption.

According to historian François Cochet, if "the same corpses are used both to honor Union soldiers who died doing their duty, and to [sic] describe rebels killed while mounting an assault on Northern patriots", it's because, in his view, "the rules of total media warfare were set as early as the American Civil War." For Héloïse Conésa, A Harvest of Death bears witness to a pioneering "falsification", as O'Sullivan seeks to "push the tragic dimension of his shooting to the extreme."

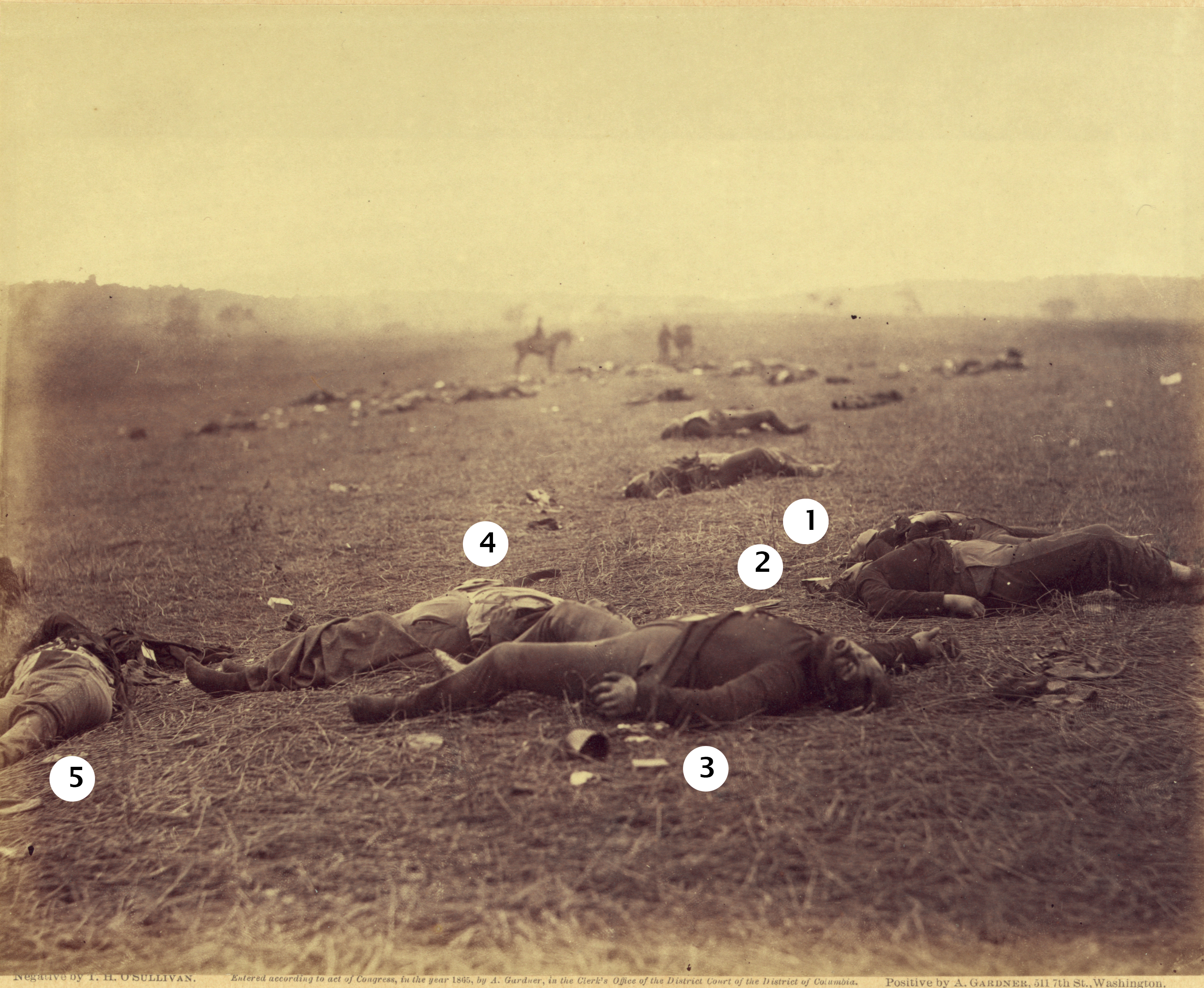
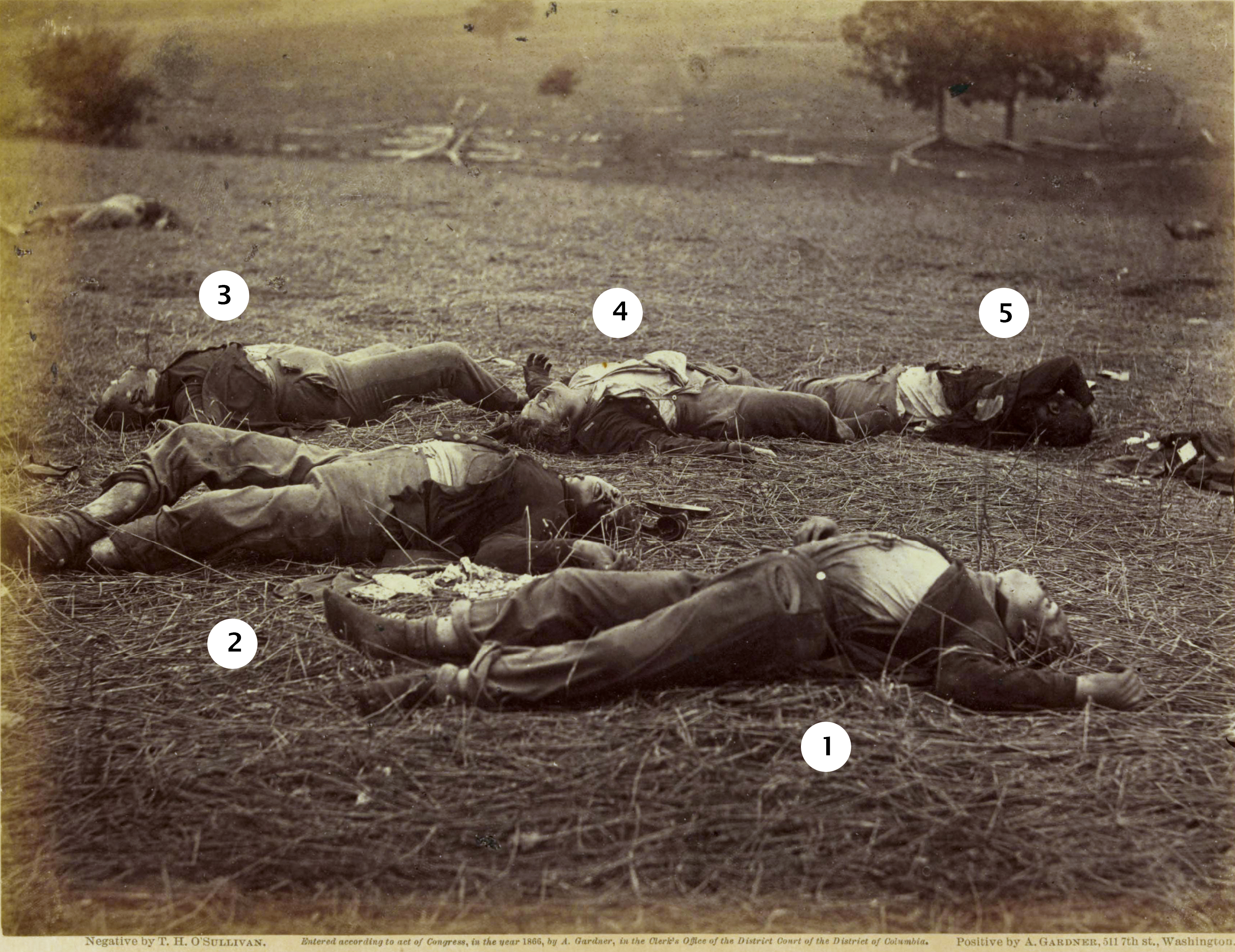
Position of the same corpses in A Harvest of Death and Field where General Reynolds Fell.

In Gardner's album, other forms of staging are found, notably for the shot representing the body of a marksman. William Frassanito has studied six photographs of this dead soldier, taken by photographers Alexander Gardner and Timothy O'Sullivan on the Gettysburg battlefield in July 1863. Four of them are located on the southern slope of Devil's Den, the original location of the infantryman's body, probably killed as he mounted the assault: "After taking pictures of the dead soldier from several angles, the two photographers noticed the sniper's picturesque lair - forty yards away - and moved the corpse into this rocky niche to photograph it again. A blanket, visible beneath the soldier in another version of the sniper's den image, may have been used to carry the body."

According to Frassanito, the type of weapon shown in these photos was not used by marksmen, but was probably an accessory brought along by the photographer himself.

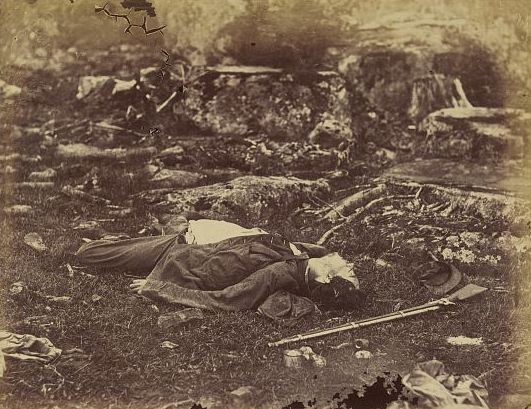
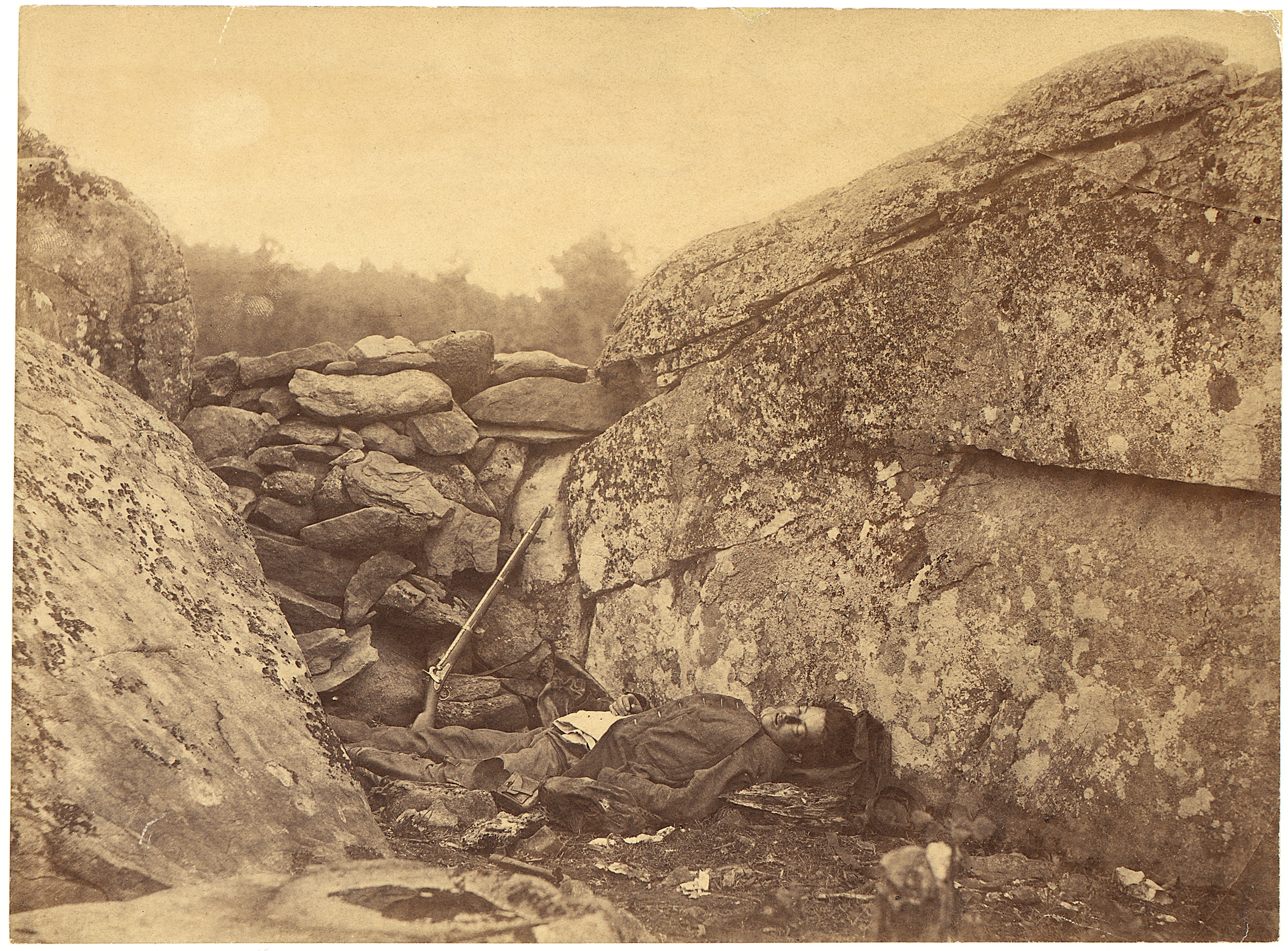
Displacement of the same corpse in two successive illustrations from the same collection by Alexander Gardner.

For historian François Cochet, this staging raises the question of the place and role of photography, as it shows "a deeply felt relationship with the 'truth', with the conviction, still widely shared, that 'it's true because it's been photographed'. This "truth", constructed and instrumentalized outside of any real administration of proof, is one of the essential dimensions of war photography."

=== Rejection of violence ===
The image caption gives rise to parallel interpretations. For Monique Sicard, researcher at the CNRS, "the violence of the images gives rise to non-violent positions, already offering counter-examples to the hypotheses formulated as early as 1917 on the links between the violence of the scenes depicted and the delinquency of young people." The website of the international photojournalism festival Visa pour l'image points to a filiation in the rejection of violence, as Gardner and O'Sullivan "revealed the other side of the heroic decor of war by using photography to describe its dreadful details, publishing the very first images of battlefields strewn with corpses. [They] took up the torch from artists such as Jacques Callot and Goya, and paved the way for other photographers who made it their duty to denounce the horrors of war."

Photography historian François Brunet shows that this "photographic gospel", with its faith in the veracity of the image, pacifism and the power of images to transform the world, lasted well into the 1930s in the United States.

=== Changing representations: the figure of the battle ===
For Hélène Puiseux, Director of Studies at the École Pratique des Hautes Études, photographs of the Crimean War, and even more clearly those of the American Civil War, helped redefine the figure of the battle, and she describes its genealogy: "When photography was born, the battle had been inscribed for several centuries both in military reality as a strategic model [...] and in cultural representations. The term [battle] hands on the same plate both the reality to the military and the fiction of that reality, afterwards, to everyone."

Civil War photographers, who lacked the equipment to capture either the moment or the geographical scale of the battle, were thus led to make temporal and spatial divisions, to emphasize the "before" and "after" of the battle: Gardner and O'Sullivan "will insist on human bodies before, after and during the battle; they will capture [...] the wounded, the corpses, the more or less dazed or triumphant survivors."

== Posterity ==
=== Gettysburg Cemetery and Address ===
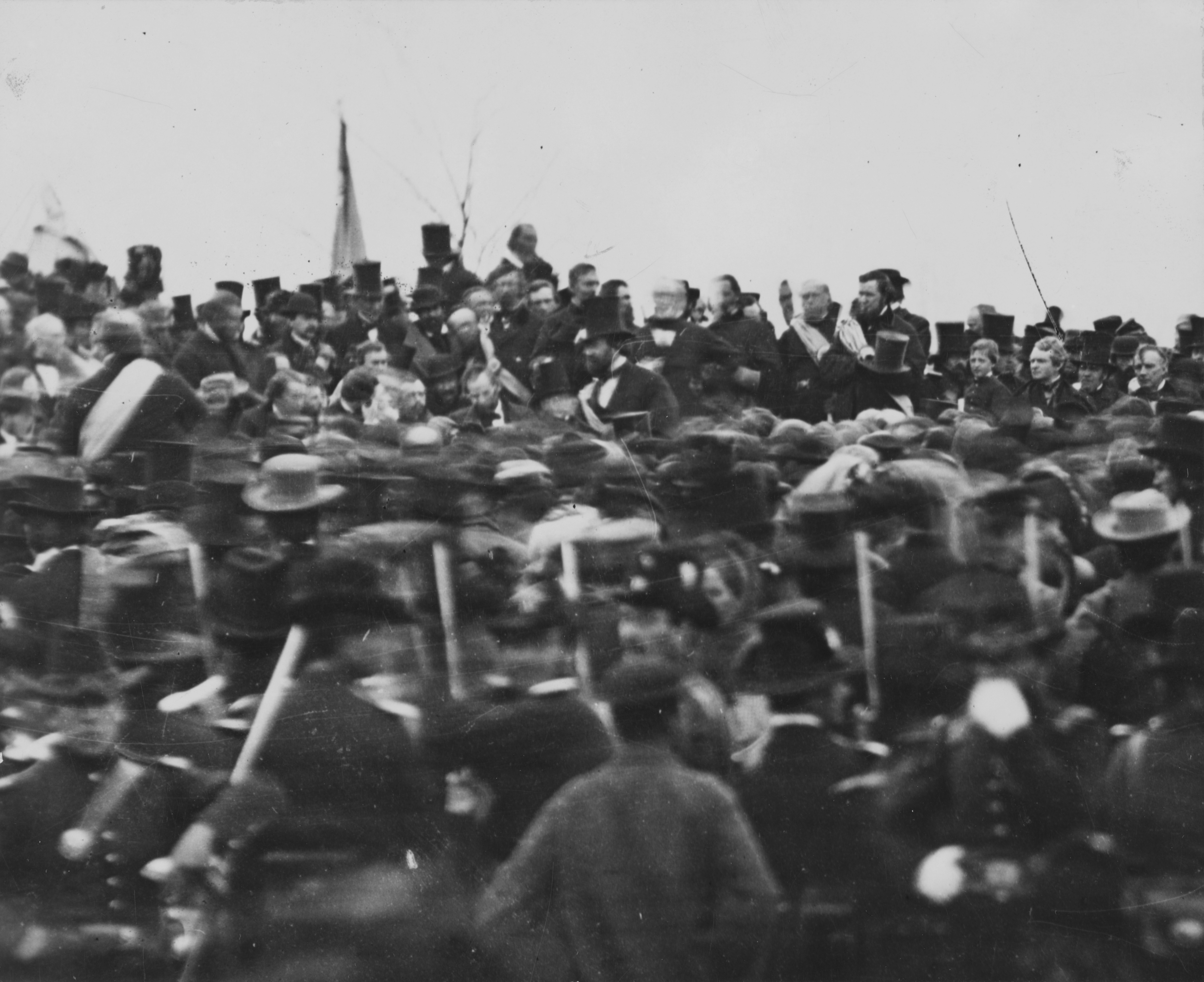
Abraham Lincoln inaugurates Gettysburg National Cemetery on November 19, 1863 (attribution disputed)

The creation of the Gettysburg National Cemetery, close to the battlefield, and President Lincoln's Gettysburg Address, are an essential milestone in American history. Four months after the battle, on November 19, 1863, the cemetery was inaugurated. At the ceremony, President Lincoln paid tribute to the fallen and delivered a historic speech, known as the "Gettysburg Address". The speech marked an evolution in Lincoln's thinking and in the aims of the war, for it was no longer just a matter of defending the Union and restricting slavery, but also of founding a new Union that would fulfill the dream of the Founding Fathers of being composed solely of free men.

=== The photographed corpse, a milestone in the history of photography ===
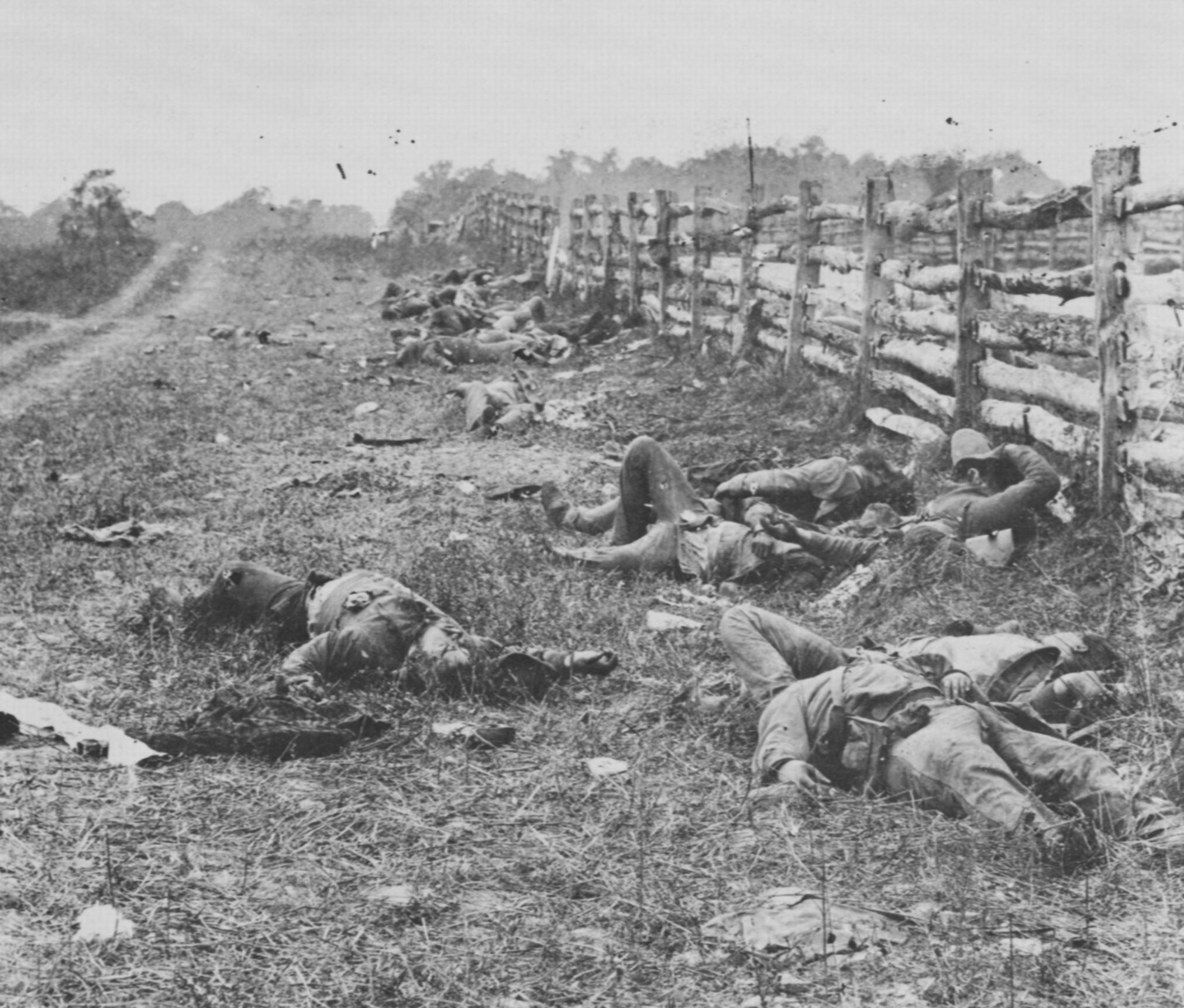
On the battlefield of Antietam, Mathew B. Brady, September 1862.

The photographic representation of soldiers' corpses poses new challenges. (Note: In 2001, the book Voir - ne pas voir la guerre (transl. Seeing - Not Seeing War) states: "Although Beato, shortly before, composed a famous view of a decimated battery, it is really the Civil War that introduces the vision of the battlefield littered with corpses. [...] The symbolic force of these war results is immense. It raises questions: Can we show dead bodies that families can identify? Are the dead a way of accusing the opponent, or should only enemy dead be displayed? Is seeing the dead always a pacifist message?.")

Ulrich Pohlmann, head of the Munich City Museum's photographic collection, believes that the groundbreaking media impact of corpse photographs on public opinion began with the exhibition of images of Antietam's dead in New York's Brady Gallery in 1862: "For the first time, death on the battlefield took on a sensitive and direct character [...]. The New York Times review of the exhibition brought Brady increased popularity and a considerable influx of customers." Sophie Delaporte, referring to the same images from 1862, believes that photographers "contribute to modifying the relationship to corporal injury and to placing an image on the very notion of the battlefield. They also broke down the barrier of invisibility of mutilated bodies or corpses, bringing the tragedy of war to the front."

But the very next year, A Harvest of Death replaced "the effect produced by Antietam in the collective memory." With this image, 1863 becomes a "landmark date in the modification of sensibilities, a milestone in the relatively new history of emotions."

Laurent Gervereau, from La contemporaine, also considers that "the Civil War introduces a new dimension to such a frigid recension of the effects of war: corpses. [...] In Sullivan and Gardner's work [...] the photographic record, in its early stages, is atrocious. Sweeping away all movement, all heroism of gesture, all narrative of bravery [...], it introduces radical perspectives." While the photographer's observation is not entirely voluntary - it is still impossible to capture the moment of combat, and photography provides a kind of post-war record - its impact is no less clear: "Why make war under these conditions? [Photographic uses of warfare] annihilate centuries of war narrative. Because war was epic, and the image illustrated the successive developments of the gesture [...]. Photography no longer tells us anything about the epicenter: combat. There is no longer courage, distress, victory or defeat. What remains is the accommodation of what's left."

Art historian François Robichon points out that, even taking O'Sullivan's staging into account, "if the photograph can be made to lie about its meaning, the corpses are very real, and the sight of them has upset established conventions."

=== Commercial failure ===
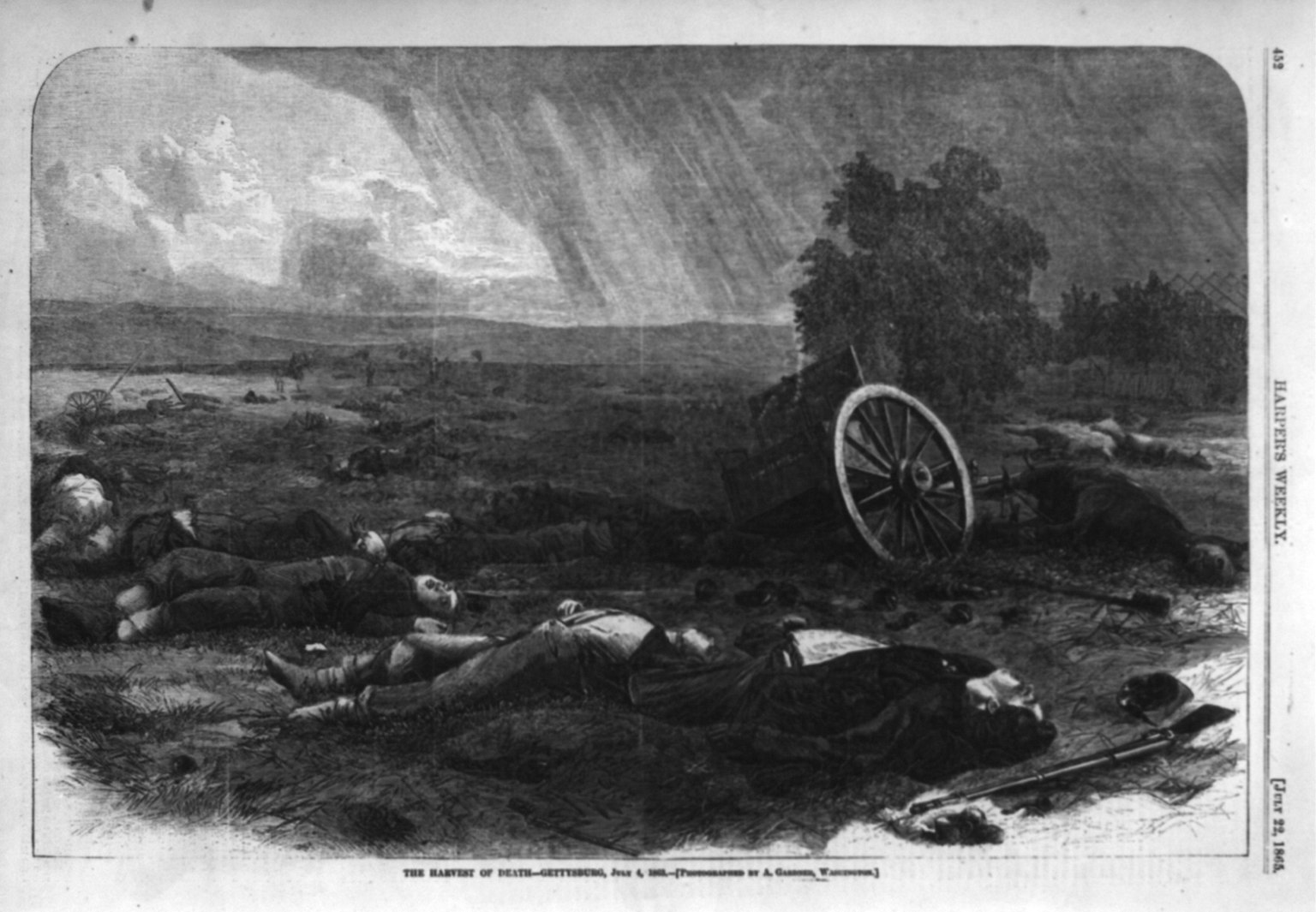
The harvest of death - Gettysburg, July 4, 1863 (Dead soldiers and horses on battlefield), Wood engraving after Gardner's photograph, Harper's Weekly, July 22, 1865, via Library of Congress.

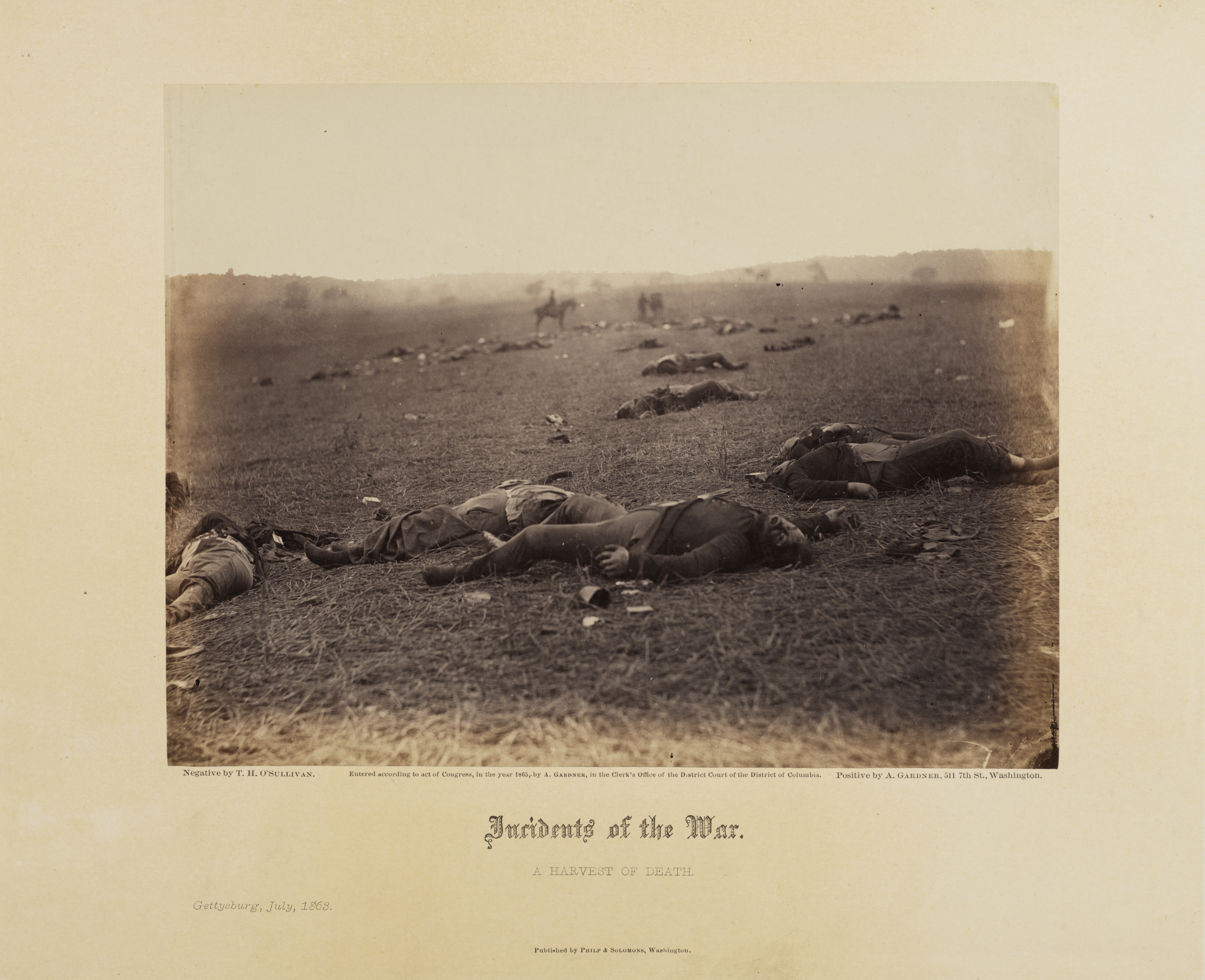
Large-format portfolio version of the photograph published by Philp & Solomons

Although the image shocked many when it was first published, it was not a commercial success, and the Photographic Sketchbook of the War found few buyers, not only because of its cost but also, according to Sophie Delaporte, because "the suffering endured during the conflict eventually turned people away" from these images.

A woodcut inspired by the photograph's motif appeared in the Harper's Weekly dated July 22, 1865.

The Brady Fund was bought out of bankruptcy by the US Congress in 1872 or 1875.

O'Sullivan then pursued a career as a photographer, documenting the exploration of American landscapes. François Brunet calls him "the most famous and [...] the most enigmatic of the exploration photographers". Forgotten for a time, his work was rediscovered in the 1930s and, in the 1970s, interpreted as that of a pioneer. Since he left no written records, only an analysis of his work allows us to approach some of his logics: working in series, the usual practice of panorama and shot/reverse shot, the variation of - natural - lighting on the same location. For Brunet, O'Sullivan creates dynamic landscapes, inhabited by rare human figures that can be interpreted as metonyms of America. He adds a certain narcissism that is not devoid of humor, as the photographer included his own equipment in a large number of images between 1860 and 1880, as a mockery of the relative anonymity imposed on government photographers.

=== Late modern period ===
==== American icon ====
Francis Trevelyan Miller's The photographic history of the Civil War, published in 1911, uses photography as a vehicle for national unity, marked by pacifism.

On the centenary of the battle, as in contemporary times, A Harvest of Death enjoyed iconic status and widespread popularity. The revelation in 1975 by military historian Frassanito of the staging elements in the photographs attributed to Brady paved the way for a new and popular approach to the historical investigation of old photos.

For Jérôme Bimbenet, "the terrible images of Timothy O'Sullivan or Matthew Brady are inscribed in the American collective unconscious." In his 2018 book on the American Civil War, historian Farid Ameur believes that "tragedy still occupies a central place in the collective memory of Americans. Thus, through film, literature, historical studies and the countless monuments dedicated to the missing, the memory of the Civil War lives on. The remarkable photographs of Matthew Brady, Timothy O'Sullivan and Alexander Gardner are endlessly examined."

Until the 21st century, photography generated amateur tourism to Gettysburg, as well as attempts to identify the exact location where the photograph was taken.

==== Photography ====
External image
- The Dreadful Details, Éric Baudelaire, 2006.

In 2006, philosopher Pierre Zaoui likened this photograph to photographer Éric Baudelaire's diptych The Dreadful Details, pointing out that it is a mise en abyme of the justifications for war imagery, and in particular its denunciatory function, clearly stated in Gardner's caption. The very title of the work is a borrowing from the introduction to the 1865, Photographic Sketch Book of the War. Art historian Héloïse Conésa continues this interpretation, recognizing in The Dreadful Details "a documentary fiction underpinned by a whole range of references, notably to Civil War photographs, such as the most famous of them all, A Harvest of Death": this photograph is famous both for being one of the first to show the battlefield covered in corpses, but also for pioneering "falsification" or staging. In 2006, A Harvest of Death thus inspired a work that questions the "nature of the 'image of history' in the contemporary era, by resorting to the industry of simulation: Hollywood." The entire scene supposedly set in Iraq during the war is made up of extras.

Photographer Robert Adams cites Timothy O'Sullivan as one of his rare sources of inspiration.

==== Education ====
The image has a strong presence in U.S. school textbooks, and raises a number of pedagogical issues, particularly in history classes. In 2005, Jean-Marie Baldner proposed a special approach to teachers based on photography. Starting from the observation that the school textbook is an achronic sum of documents, all presented in a certain immediacy and with a supposedly spontaneous comprehension ("everyone sees and therefore knows, because everyone looks at photo reports every day"), he promotes in the classroom an assumed, controlled anachronistic reading of old photographs, such as A Harvest of Death, the analysis of which would bring out, for pupils, questions useful for reading photo reports of current conflicts.

== See also ==
- Battle of Gettysburg
- Gettysburg Address
- Pennsylvania in the American Civil War
- Photographers of the American Civil War
- List of photographs considered the most important
