= Hervé Pinoteau =

French historian and royalist apologist (1927–2020)

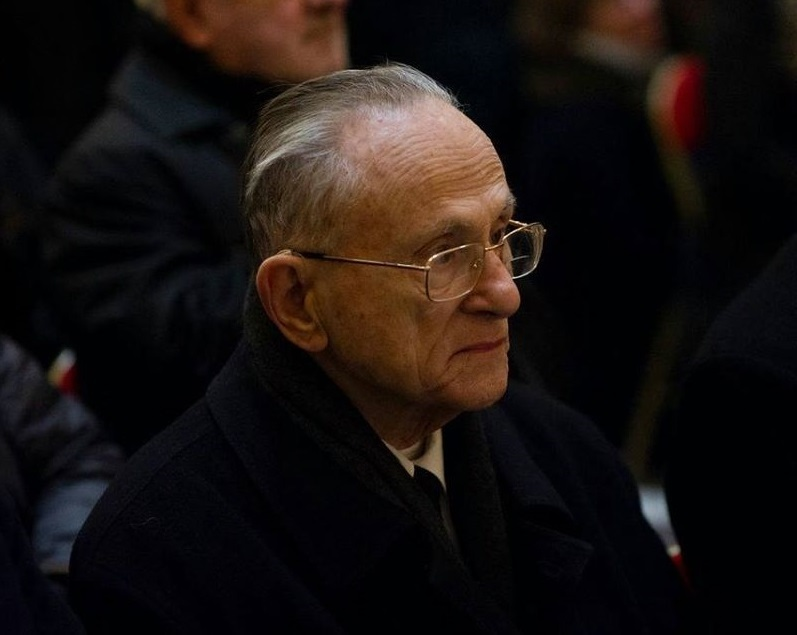
Pinoteau in 2019

Hervé Pinoteau, 6th Baron Pinoteau (19 July 1927 – 24 November 2020) was a French historian, expert in heraldic research and royalist apologist. He was the author of more than 900 articles and 22 books primarily on history and heraldry.

== Biography ==
Pinoteau was born in Paris. From 1950 to 1951, he served in the French army as a lieutenant. He served as the private secretary of the late Prince Alphonse, Duke of Anjou, for 26 years.

Pinoteau was a member of the Académie Internationale d'Héraldique (International Academy of Heraldry) of which he was general secretary from 1964 to 1988. He was president of the Société nationale des Antiquaires de France in 2010. He was recognized as an expert in French heraldry and vexillology. He was commissioned to create the coat of arms of the Pays de la Loire region of France, and to do the final design for the coat of arms of the Republic of Chad. Pinoteau was a monarchist who believed in the restoration of the House of Bourbon to the French throne. He was the founder of the Secretariat-du Prince Alphonse, Duc de Bourbon (1962) and the Institut de la maison de Bourbon (1973). He was considered one of the revitalizers of the Legitimist movement in France.

== Awards ==
- Bailiff Knight Grand Cross of Justice of the Sacred Military Constantinian Order of Saint George (Italian: Sacro Militare Ordine Costantiniano di San Giorgio)
- Knight of the Legion of Honour (French: Ordre national de la Légion d'honneur)
- Commander of the Order of Prince Henry the Navigator (Portuguese: Ordem do Infante Dom Henrique)
- Grand officer of the Civil Order of Alfonso X, the Wise (Spanish: Orden de Alfonso X el Sabio)
- 1990 - National History Prize of the National Academy of Reims - Paillard Foundation (l’Académie nationale de Reims - Fondation Paillard)

== Selected works ==
Among his many publications are contributions to:

- Encyclopædia universalis (Thesaurus Index),
- Dictionnaire du Grand siècle de François Bluche,
- Dictionnaire du Second Empire de Jean Tulard,
- Encyclopédie de la culture française d’Éclectis,
- Dictionnaire de biographie française, and
- Dictionnaire mondial des images de Laurent Gervereau.

=== Books ===
- Monarchie et avenir, Nouvelles Editions Latines, Paris 1960
- L'héraldique capétienne, 1976, revised 2000
- L'État de l'Ordre du Saint-Esprit en 1830 et la survivance des ordres du roi, 1983
- Hervé Pinoteau, Fabien Gandrille, Christian Papet-Vauban, Etat présent de la maison de Bourbon : pour servir de suite à l'almanach royal de 1830 et à d'autres publications officielles de la Maison, Léopard d'or, 1986
- Études sur les ordres de chevalerie du Roi de France, Le léopard d'Or, Paris 1995
- Le chaos français et ses signes, 1998
- Hervé Pinoteau, Jean de Vaulchier, Jacques Amable de Saulieu, Jean de Bodinat, Armorial de l'ANF - Association d'entraide de la Noblesse Française - Hervé Pinoteau : Héraldique et noblesse en préface de l'ouvrage
- La symbolique royale française, 2004
- Saint Louis: Son entourage et la symbolique chrétienne, 2006
- Cinq études d'héraldique et de symbolique étatique, Léopard d'or, 2007
