= Massaponax Baptist Church =

Historic church in Virginia, US

- U.S. National Register of Historic Places
- Virginia Landmarks Register
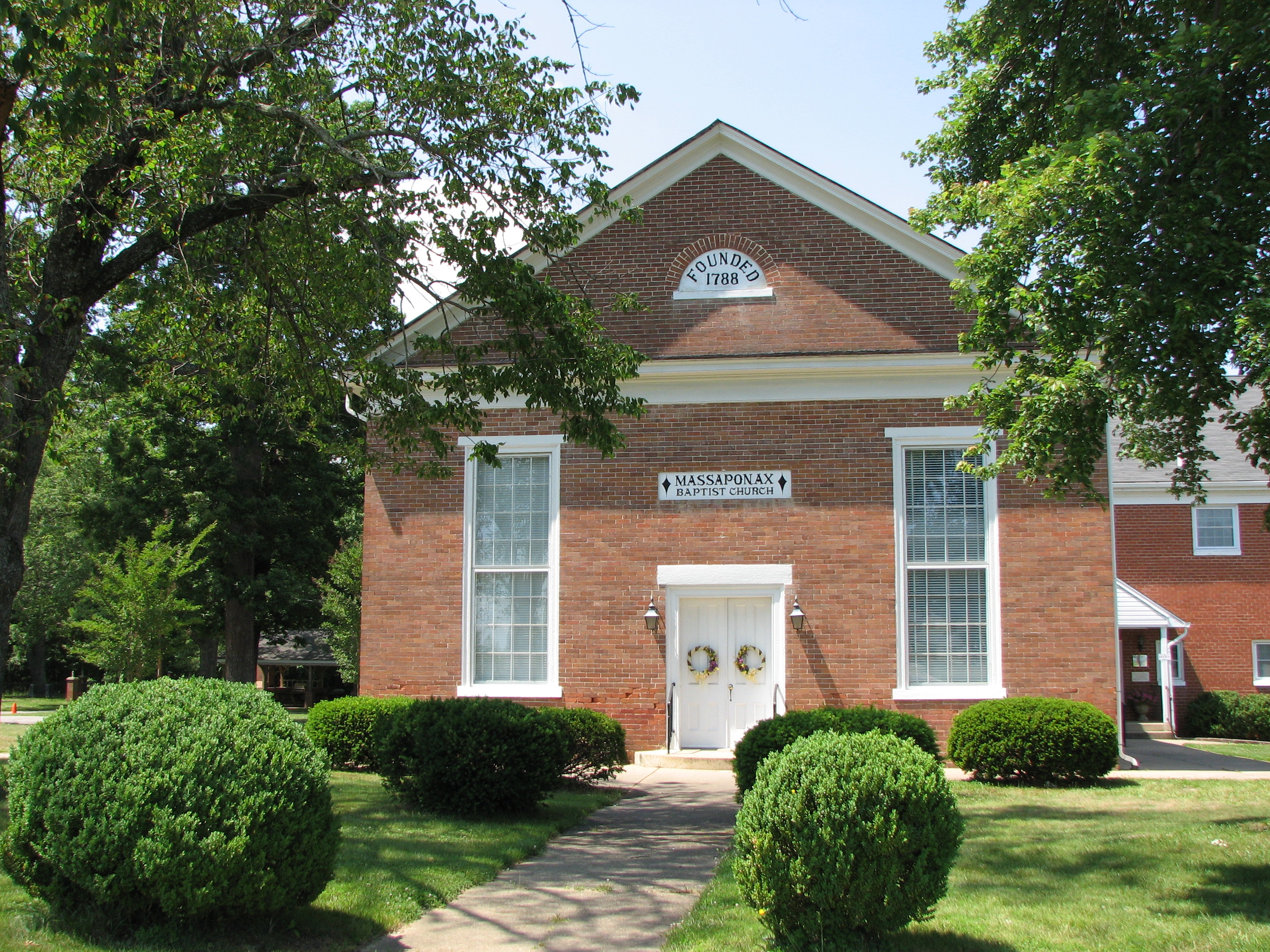
- Massaponax Baptist Church (Spotsylvania County, Virginia)

- Location within Northern Virginia Location within Virginia Location within the United States
- Location: Junction of US 1 and County Route 608, near Massaponax, Virginia
- Coordinates: 38°11′36″N 77°30′37″W
- Area: 3.5 acres (1.4 ha)
- Built: 1859
- Architectural style: Mid 19th Century Revival
- NRHP reference No.: 90002137
- VLR No.: 088-0122

Significant dates
- Added to NRHP: January 24, 1991
- Designated VLR: February 20, 1990

Massaponax Baptist Church is a Baptist church built in the Greek Revival style, located in Spotsylvania County, Virginia. It is affiliated with the Southern Baptist Convention. The Baptist congregation that built the church was established in 1788 at a small church near Massaponax Creek. When that building became too small to hold the growing congregation, the church was moved to its present location at the intersection of U.S. Route 1 and State Route 608 (Massaponax Church Road). The new church was a small, frame building which was also outgrown. In 1859, the current brick building was constructed on the site. Kilns in a nearby field fired the bricks for the exterior walls. By October 1859 the new church was completed at a cost of $3,000. Joseph Billingsly was the first pastor in the new building. An addition was built in 1949 and a brick cottage for the pastor, was built near the church in 1956. The church was listed on the National Register of Historic Places in January 1991.

Not long after the new church was occupied, the American Civil War began. Black members of the church were given letters of dismissal. Several small churches were established for the disenfranchised blacks.

Church services ended for the duration of the war. During that time, the church was used as a stable, hospital, headquarters for planning strategy. Soldiers used the interior walls to draw scenes of battle, write messages, and leave names of troops, companies, and soldiers. The walls were whitewashed after the war to cover the graffiti. In 1938, during renovation work, the writing on the walls was exposed. Portions of the graffiti are now visible behind plexiglass frames.

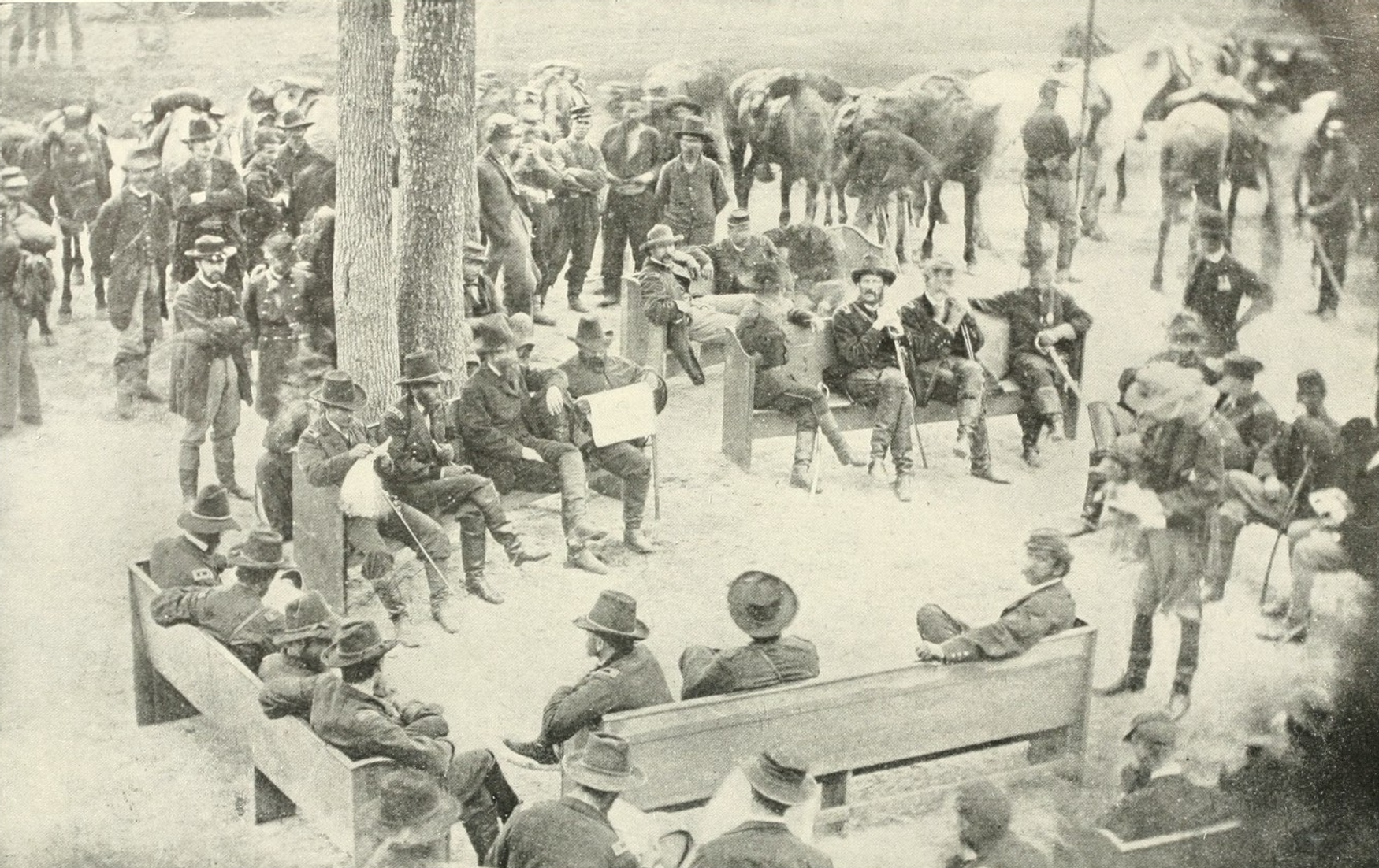
Grant meets with staff on pews outside Massaponax Baptist Church

On May 21, 1864, Lieutenant General Ulysses S. Grant, Major General George Meade, other generals and their staffs met at the church after the Battle of Spotsylvania Court House. Also present was Assistant Secretary of War Charles A. Dana. During the meeting, Grant ordered his troops to carry church pews outside to provide a place for the generals to rest and plan strategy. The meeting was photographed from the second floor of the church by Timothy H. O'Sullivan, a noted 19th-century photographer of the Civil War and, later, of the Western United States.
