= War, Literature & the Arts =

- Editor: Donald Anderson
- Categories: Literary magazine
- Frequency: Annually
- Publisher: United States Air Force Academy
- Founded: 1989
- Country: United States
- Based in: Colorado Springs
- Language: English
- Website: www.wlajournal.com
- ISSN: 1949-9752 (print); 2169-7914 (web)
- OCLC: 45894909

War, Literature & the Arts is an American literary magazine that publishes stories, poems, essays, reviews, and visuals related to war and military affairs. It was established in 1989 and is based at the United States Air Force Academy in Colorado. The editor-in-chief is Kathleen Harrington.

== Awards ==
Work that has appeared in the magazine has been selected and short-listed for the Pushcart Prize, The Best American Short Stories, and The Best American Essays.

== See also ==
- List of literary magazines
