= Timothy H. O'Sullivan =

American photographer (c.1840–1882)

- Timothy H. O'Sullivan, Carte de visite by Philp & Solomons, c. 1870 National Portrait Gallery, Smithsonian Institution.
- Born: Timothy H. O'Sullivan c. 1840; New York, United States (or Ireland)
- Died: January 14, 1882 (aged c. 40-42); Staten Island
- Occupations: Photographer; photojournalist

Timothy H. O'Sullivan (c. 1840 – January 14, 1882) was an American photographer widely known for his work related to the American Civil War and the Western United States.

== Biography ==
Little is known about O'Sullivan's early life. Some sources state that he was born in Ireland and moved to New York City at a young age, while other sources give his place of birth as New York. As a teenager, he was employed by Mathew Brady.

O'Sullivan claimed that when the Civil War began in early 1861, he was commissioned a first lieutenant in the Union army. Though, there is no record of him fighting. Alexander Gardner worked as a photographer on the staff of General George B. McClellan, commander of the Army of the Potomac, and was given the honorary rank of captain. Gardner described O'Sullivan as the "Superintendent of my map and field work." Biographer James D. Horan writes that O'Sullivan was a civilian photographer attached to the Topographical Engineers. His job was to copy maps and plans, but he also took photographs on his own time. Although he later listed himself as a first lieutenant, the rank was likely honorary, like Gardner's. From November 1861 through April 1862, O'Sullivan, working for Gardner, followed Union forces to Fort Walker, Fort Beauregard, Beaufort, Hilton Head, and Fort Pulaski.

After being honorably discharged, he rejoined Brady's team. In July 1862, O'Sullivan followed Maj. Gen. John Pope's Northern Virginia Campaign. By joining Gardner's studio, he had his forty-four photographs published in the first Civil War photographs collection, Gardner's Photographic Sketch Book of the War. In July 1863, he created his most famous photograph, A Harvest of Death, depicting dead soldiers from the Battle of Gettysburg.

He took many other photographs documenting the battle, including Dead Confederate sharpshooter at foot of Little Round Top, Field where General Reynolds fell, View in wheatfield opposite our extreme left, Confederate dead gathered for burial at the southwestern edge of the Rose woods, Bodies of Federal soldiers near the McPherson woods, "Slaughter pen", and others.

In 1864, following Gen. Ulysses S. Grant's trail, he photographed the Siege of Petersburg before briefly heading to North Carolina to document the siege of Fort Fisher. That brought him to the Appomattox Court House, the site of Robert E. Lee's surrender in April 1865.

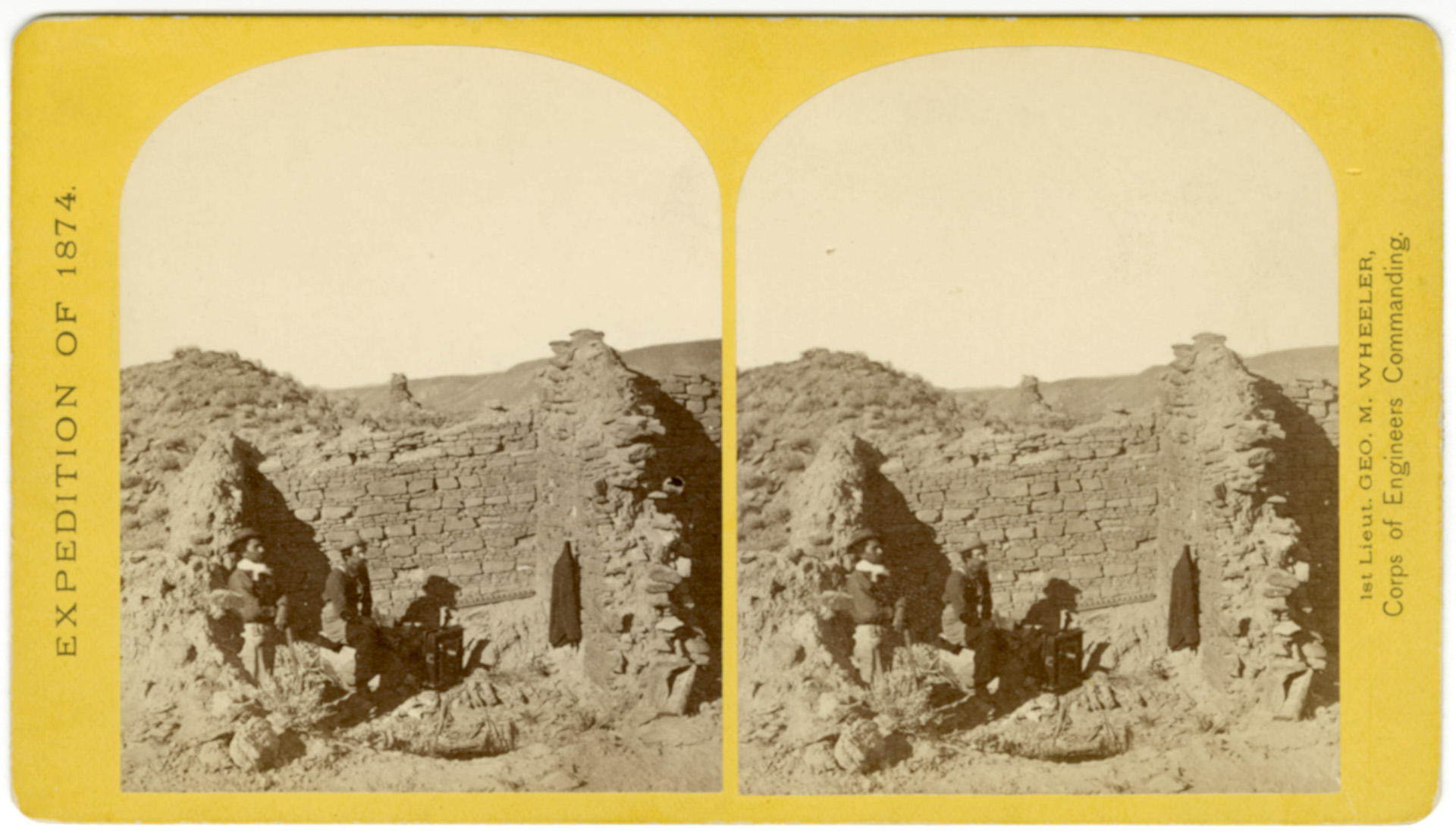
Timothy H. O'Sullivan, Pueblo San Juan, New Mexico, 1874, stereoscopic albumen prints, National Gallery of Art, Washington, DC, Department of Image Collections.

From 1867 to 1869, he was the official photographer on the United States Geological Exploration of the Fortieth Parallel under Clarence King. The expedition began at Virginia City, Nevada, where he photographed the mines, and worked eastward. In so doing, he became one of the pioneers in the field of geophotography. In contrast to the Asian and Eastern landscape fronts, the subject matter he focused on was a new concept. It involved taking pictures of nature as an untamed, pre-industrialized land without the use of landscape painting conventions. O'Sullivan combined science and art, making exact records of extraordinary beauty.

In 1870, he joined a survey team in Panama to survey for a canal across the isthmus. From 1871 to 1874, he returned to the southwestern United States to join Lt. George M. Wheeler in his survey west of the 100th meridian. His job was to photograph the West to attract settlers. O'Sullivan's pictures were among the first to record the prehistoric ruins, Navajo weavers, and pueblo villages of the Southwest. He faced starvation on the Colorado River when some of the expedition's boats capsized; few of the 300 negatives he took survived the trip back East. He spent the last years of his short life in Washington, D.C., as official photographer for the U.S. Geological Survey and the Treasury Department.

O'Sullivan died on January 14, 1882, aged 42, in Staten Island, of tuberculosis.

In 1978, O'Sullivan Peak in Utah was officially named in his honor.

In 1986, O'Sullivan was inducted into the International Photography Hall of Fame and Museum.

== Gallery ==
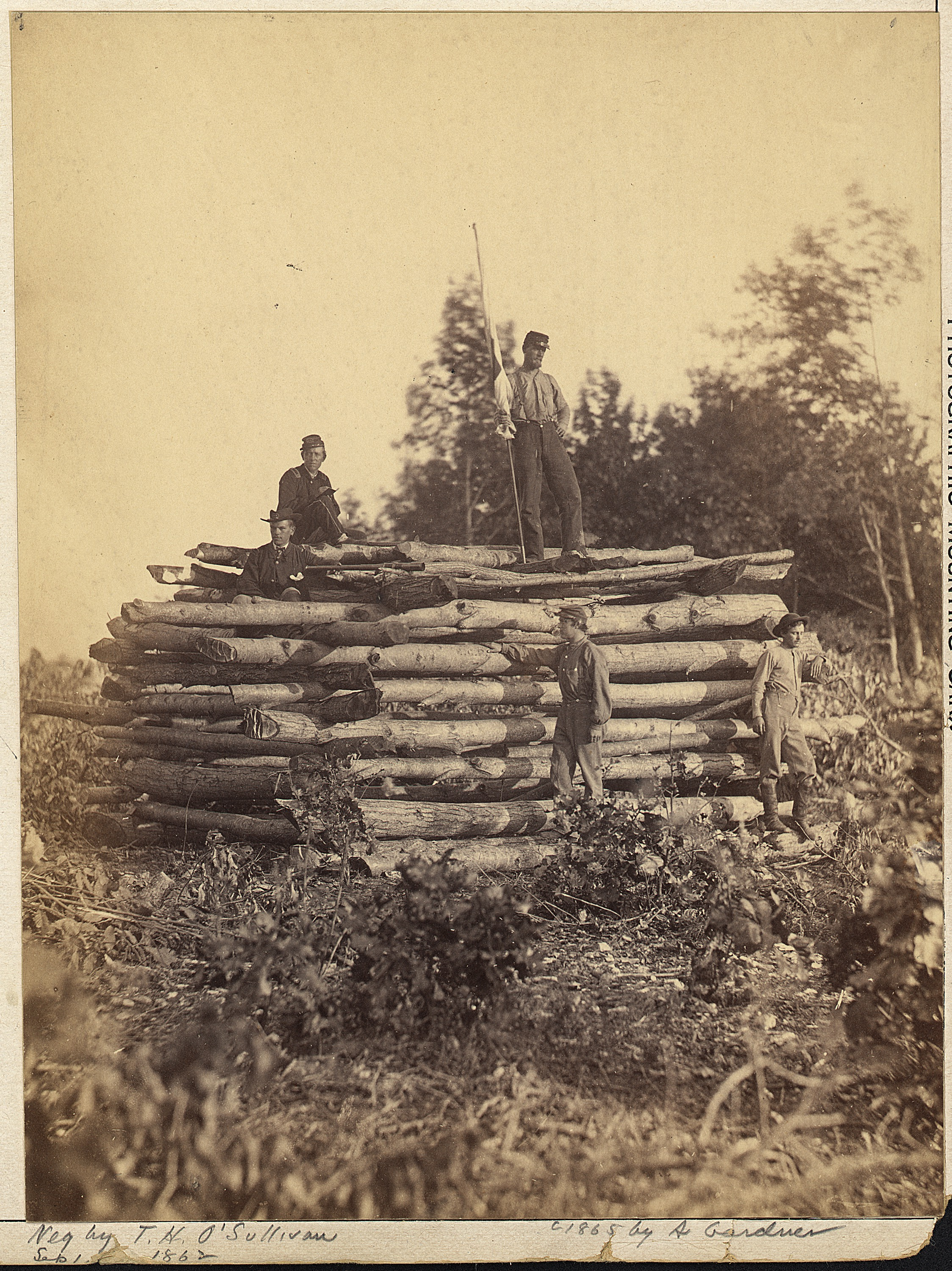
Elk Mountain (Maryland) signal tower, 1862

"Guard Mount. Headquarters Army of the Potomac", page from Gardner's Photographic Sketchbook of the War, Volume 2, published in 1863

"Confederate prisoners at court-house in Fairfax, Virginia", June 1863

A Harvest of Death: Union dead on the battlefield at Gettysburg, Pennsylvania, photographed July 5–6, 1863

"Pennsylvania, Gettysburg", the actual town in July 1863

John Burns, veteran of the War of 1812, and "old hero of Gettysburg", 1863 (modern positive of glass negative)

General Grant's Council of War, Massaponax Church, Virginia, May 21, 1864 (uncut albumin print)

Chief Officer and Clerks of the Ambulance Department, 9th Army Corps, in Front of Petersburg, Virginia, August 1864

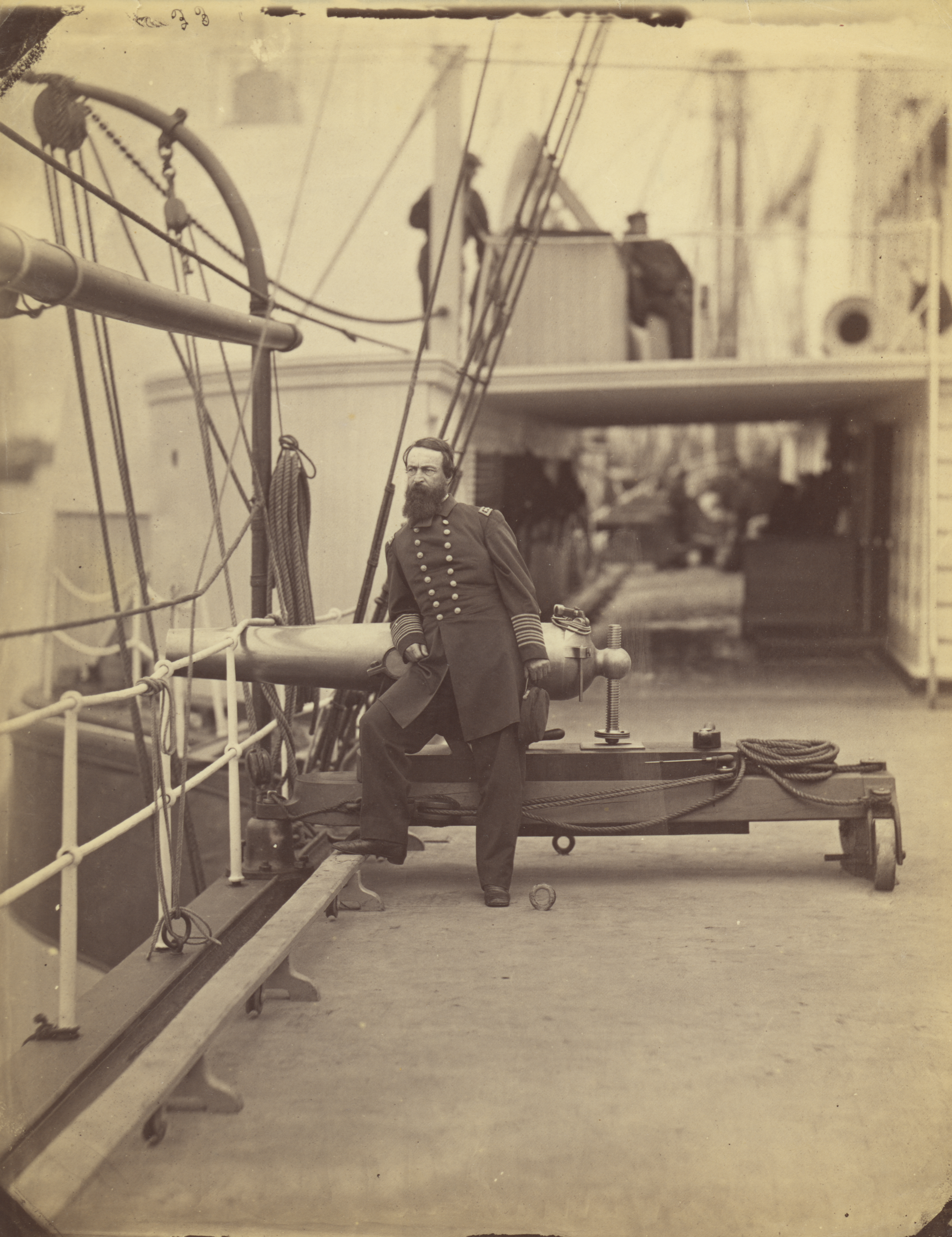
Admiral David Dixon Porter on the Deck of His Flagship the "Malvern" After the Victory at Ft. Fisher, 1865

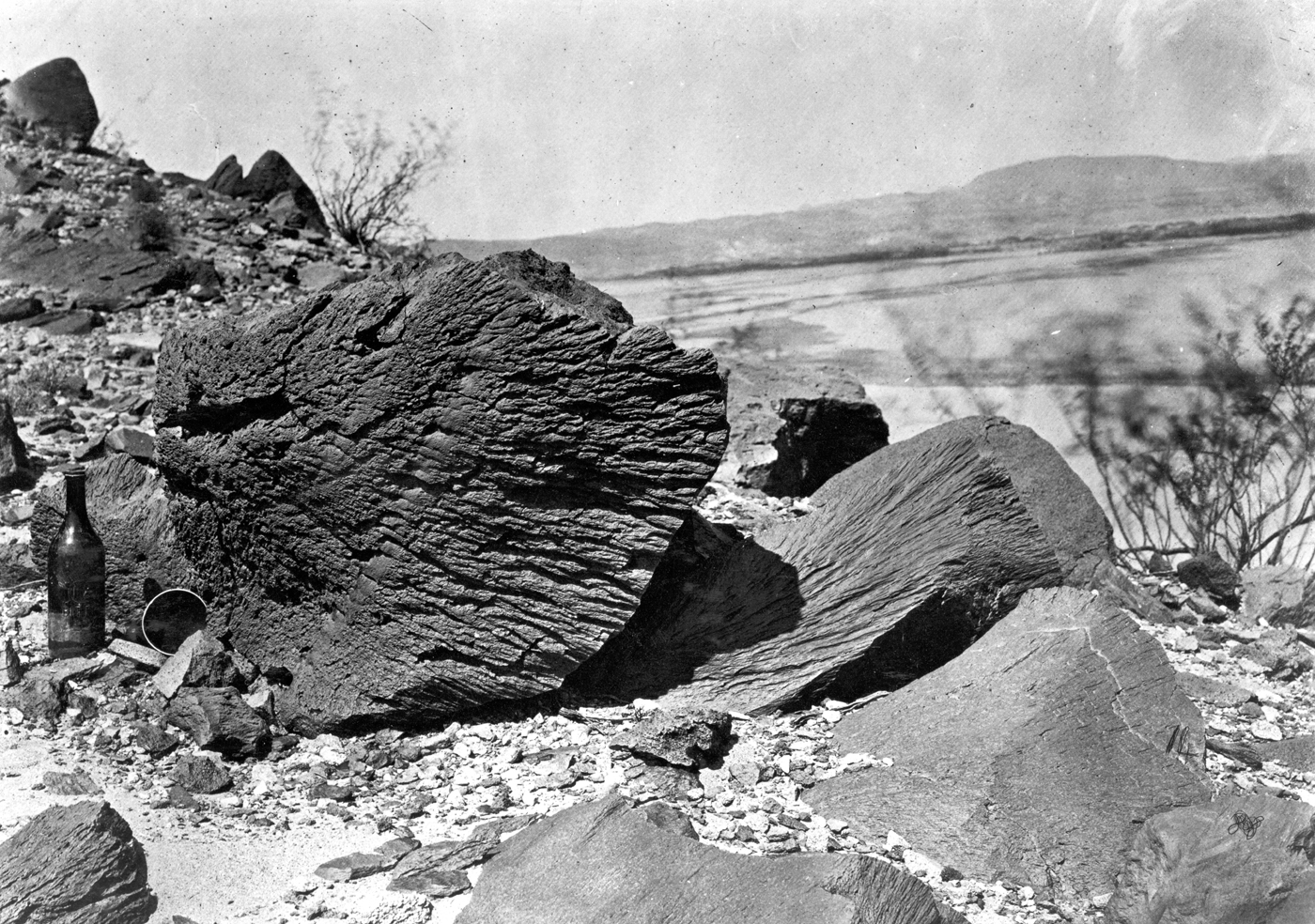
Rock carved by drifting sand below Fortification Rock in Arizona, 1871.

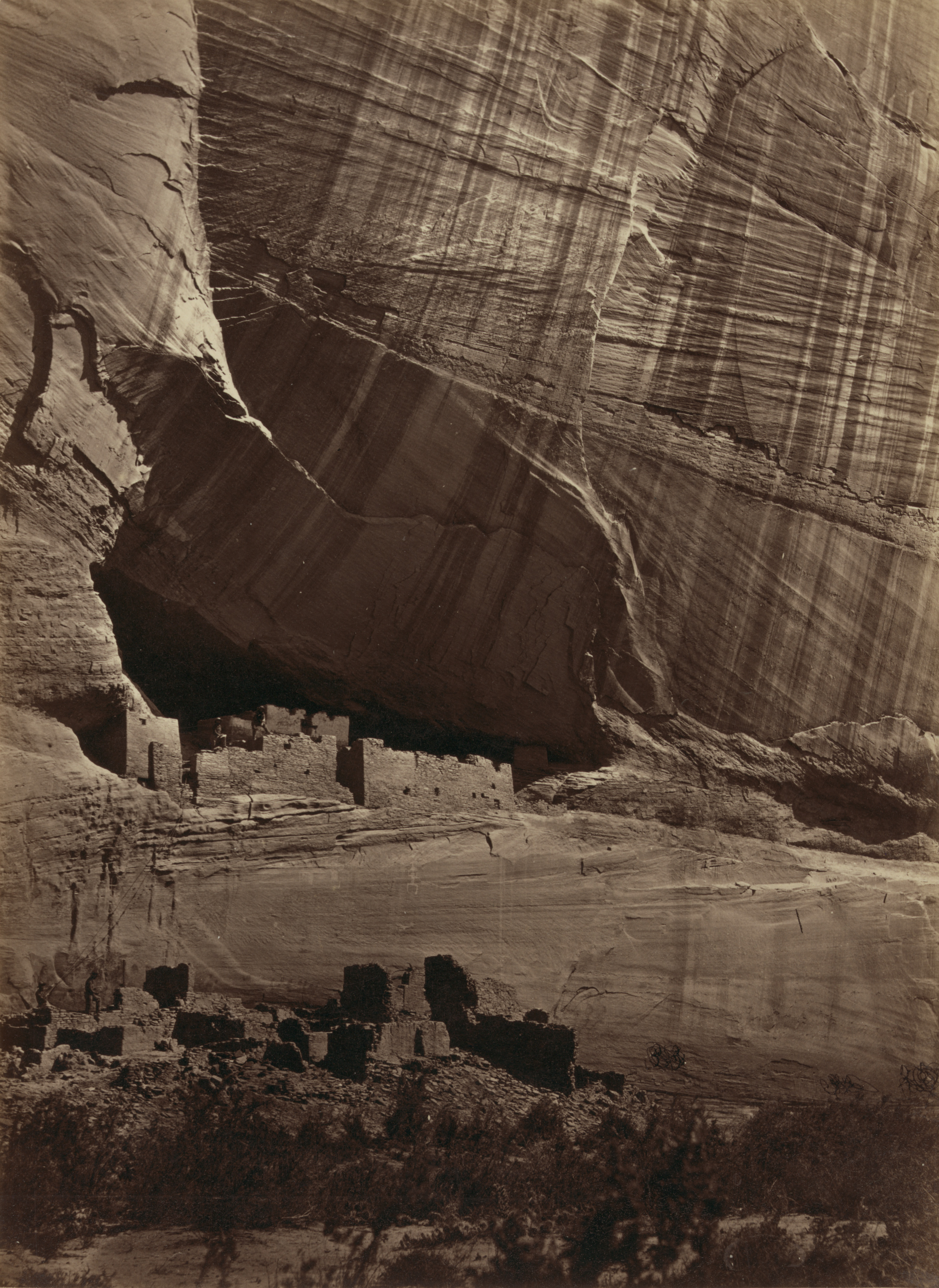
White House Ruins, Canyon de Chelly National Monument, 1873

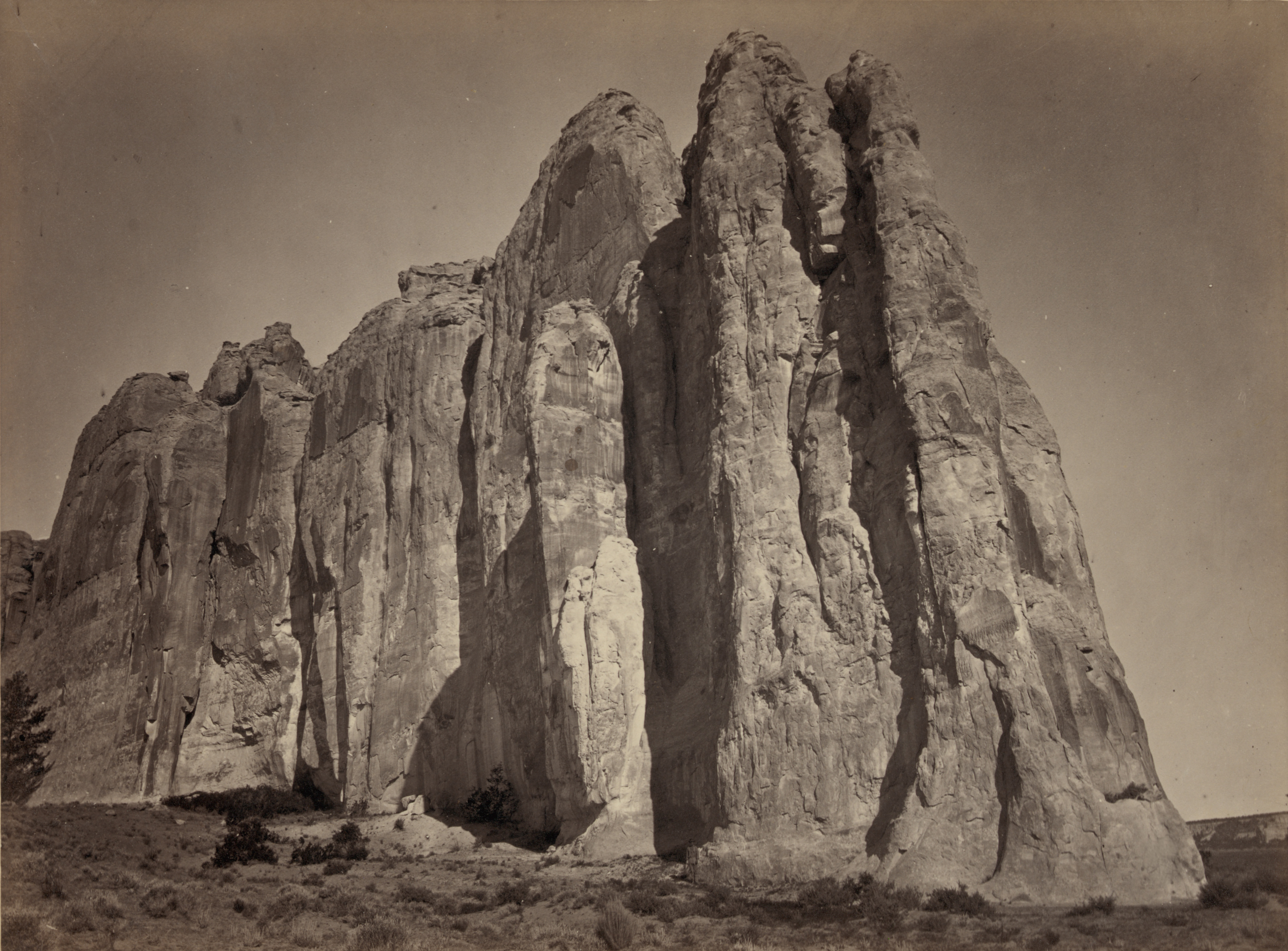
Inscription Rock, El Morro National Monument, 1873

== Sources ==
- Horan, James D. (1966). Timothy O'Sullivan, America's Forgotten Photographer. The Life and Work of the Brilliant Photographer Whose Camera Recorded the American Scene from the Battlefields of the Civil War to the Frontiers of the West. Garden City, New York: Doubleday & Company. OCLC 638552.
- Frassanito, William A. Early Photography at Gettysburg. Gettysburg, PA: Thomas Publications, 1995. ISBN 1-57747-032-X.
- Biography of Timothy H. O'Sullivan from The Getty Museum
- from the Tucson Weekly, March 31, 2003, by. Accessed July 29, 2010.
- Trachtenberg, Alan (1989). Reading American Photographs. Images as History, from Mathew Brady to Walker Evans. New York: Hill & Wang.
