= Laurent Gervereau =

French visual artist and historian

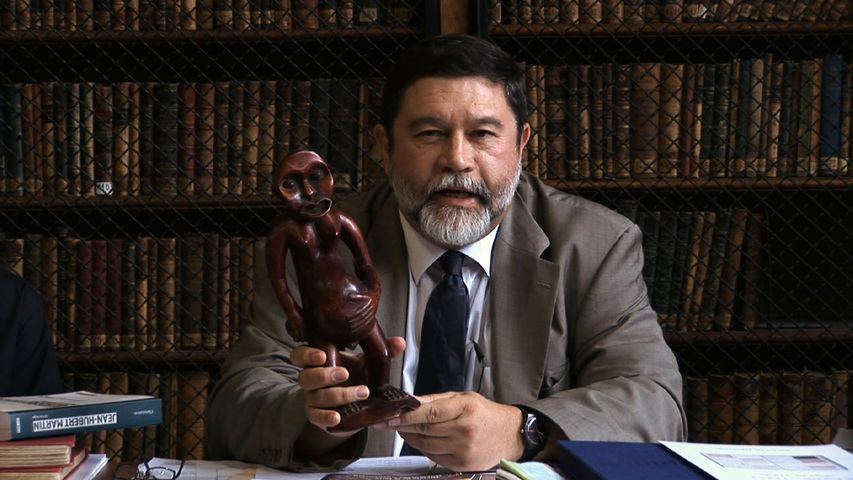
Laurent Gervereau

Laurent Gervereau (born 1956, in Paris) is a French artist, novelist, philosopher and filmmaker. The founder of the discipline of Visual History (or Histiconologia), he has devoted his professional life to the world of images, as well as to the direction of cultural and international institutions.

== Artistic career ==
Gervereau has been actively engaged in the art world since the 1970s, having participated in exhibitions with several notable surrealists (Philippe Soupault, Belgian or Czech surrealists, Mirabelle Dors, Alfred Courmes, Maurice Rapin, Clovis Trouille, etc.). His artistic and cultural interests include the Dada movement, Proudhon, Charles Fourier, Guy Debord and the situationist movement. He is a member of the Collège de 'Pataphysique.

In 1977, he founded the pataphysico-situationist review Aux poubelles de la Gloire with Guy Bodson. There were 13 issues and it finished in 1979. This was the beginning of his philosophy of relativity (Pour une philosophie de la relativité, 2010) against relativism. He then built his theories about cultural ecology, evolutionism, necessity of diversity and movement (plurofuturo), of choice between past and future (retrofuturo) and his struggle against those who have only one way to look at the world, inheritated from the past, and want to uniformise the entire planet (monoretros).

He began then his long novel called L'homme planétaire (end of the 1970s). The middle part of this triptych was published by Sens & Tonka in 2001 with the title Ce livre n'est pas à lire (This Book is Not to be Read). It was chosen by the Les Inrockuptibles magazine and the radio channel France Culture as one of the seven best novels of the year. This book is an experiment in mixed media and local-global description in literature: the "crossmedialism". He will make the adaptation for manga of the third part of the tryptique with a Chinese artist Xin Ye ("Mixplanet", 2011).

In 1989, he built with Louis Rollinde a new artistic group with a new review in English and French: Painters of History (Les Peintres d'histoire). Exhibitions were held in Naples, Paris and Hanover. To struggle against the new maelstrom of images, he defended rarity in art and the difficulty to see with hidden images (La Disparition des images, 2003). So, he combines art actions or art productions and the creation of unique pieces ("Unik" movement which defends rarity and magic).

After he began to make short movies during the 1970s, he released eight movies. They are experimental documentaries belonging to the "cinema espresso" and were shown from 2009 to 2012 (and after). Official projections were made in January 2011 in the Reflet Médicis in Paris.

He agreed to become president of the See-socioecolo Network, founded in 2010 in Brazil and Canada (official website of the socioecolo evolutionnists). In the end of 2012 he published LE LOCAL-GLOBAL. Changer soi pour changer la planète (The Local-Global. Change yourself to change the Planet) and was nicknamed for years "Mister Local-Global". Last but not least, in 2012, he made an artistic action in Hong Kong with the words: "economy is a belief". In France, he chose: "nostalgia = cancer". Other members act in Brazil and Canada, and in some other countries for the World Campaign "Knowledge is beautiful".

He creates the local-global annual meeting in Argentat sur Dordogne (France): Les Rencontres-Promenades "Histoires de Passages...". Cabu gave the drawing for the 1st edition (July 2015), which is his last poster, in December 2014.

== The scientific and professional aspects ==
He first worked in bookshops and in a bank (Crédit Agricole) to get money to live. He made the choice on October 1, 1978, to work in a museum. It had two consequences: first, to act for the transformation of the patrimonial institutions all over the world (look at the networks part in networks section); second, made the choice to base his researches on all kind of images because he discovered that 98% of the pieces in the collections interested nobody. Then, became the specialist of the World History of Images or Histiconologia (website for cultural education).

He became the curator of the Museum of Contemporary History (Musée d'Histoire contemporaine de la Bibliothèque de documentation internationale contemporaine) in 1991 where he did a lot of exhibitions. In 1991, he founded the International Association of Museums of History (website of the International Association of Museums of History) and was the president for 14 years. In 1992, he founded the Group L'Image with Fabrice d'Almeida, Antoine de Baecque, Philippe Buton, Christian Delporte, Laurence Bertrand Dorléac, and David El Kenz. The review is distributed by Gallimard in France and Harvard University in the United States. There are many contributions such as his interview of Ernst Gombrich in London or Arturo Schwarz in Milan about Marcel Duchamp. International colloquiums were held ("Où va l'histoire de l'art contemporain?" / "Where does the History of Contemporary Art go?", "Peut-on apprendre à voir?" / "How to learn to see?", "Quelle est la place des images en histoire?" / "What is the Place of Images in History?" ) and websites were invented with the help of the French government or the European Commission (imagesmag.net, imageduc.net, primages.net) as CD-roms (collection [décrypter les images] |deciphere the images]). Now all these activities belong to the Institute of Images and website of cultural education.

In the Museum of Contemporary History, he works with a lot of different researchers and artists. He built comparative exhibitions (Germany and France during the 1920s, Great Britain and France during the 1960s), exhibitions about foreign countries as Yugoslav space or Russia and USSR and also exhibitions about difficult subjects concerning French history: propaganda under the Vichy Government (1991), War in Algeria (1992), history of immigration, Dreyfus Affair, Deportation, Images and colonies etc. In 2001, he became director of the Museum of Cinema-Henri Langlois in the Cinémathèque française in Paris.

Every two years, he organized world congresses with different subjects ("How to organize a Multipolar World?", April 2004 in Brazil). He led the EUROCLIO Network about history of Europe and heritage, helped by the European Commission from 1999 to 2003 with numerous institutions from all countries of the European Union and more. He built the Museums of Europe Network, founding the review of comparatist history "Comparare" with Jacques Le Goff, Eric Hobsbawm, Carlo Ginzburg, Rudolf von Thadden, Bronislaw Geremek. He wrote the book Vous avez dit musées? Tout savoir sur la crise culturelle / You said museums? To know everything about the cultural crisis (CNRS Editions).

Concerning the question of images, he published a lot of books during 30 years. The general bibliography (except articles and conferences) is on: official website of Laurent Gervereau, look at "traces". Here are some main examples: about the method to analyse images, Voir, comprendre, analyser les images (La Découverte); with Cabu, educative comics for children, "Le monde des images. Comprendre les images pour ne pas se faire manipuler" (Robert Laffont); le Dictionnaire mondial des images/ World Dictionary of Images (Nouveau monde); the general history of images, Images, une histoire mondiale (Nouveau monde/CNDP); Un siècle de manipulations par l'image (Somogy Editions d'art), Inventer l'actualité (La Découverte), La Guerre mondiale médiatique (Nouveau monde), the exhibition and the book Les images mentent? Manipuler les images ou manipuler le public: general website for cultural education. Some translations are done (in Portuguese and in Arabic), but there is still a lack for some important languages as English, Spanish or Chinese.

Gervereau is now the president of the Institut des Images and director of: general website for cultural education. In July 2013, he created on this website a monthly cultural video magazine: [decryptcult].

In 2004, he became also the director of the International Museum of Ecology: Musée du Vivant (du Vivant). He created a world network in UNESCO during the Congress of December 2005 in Te Papa Museum (New Zealand): Ecology and Sustainable Development Network. He wrote in 2011 "Une histoire générale de l'écologie en images" ("A General History of Ecology in Images", about the relations between humanity and environment from prehistory). In 2012, he organized with Christian Delporte the international colloquium "Patrimoine de l'écologie et écologie du patrimoine" / "Heritage of Ecology, Ecology of Heritage".

The historian Jacques Le Goff, who directed Annales review Annales School, wrote in the newspaper Le Monde (December 15, 2006) about the World Dictionary of Images: "President of the Institute of Images, Laurent Gervereau published a book that will be essential. He built a team to work on the question of all types of images, a team of exceptional specialists, artists or celebrated intellectuals or brilliant young researchers. We know that, after the last years of the 20th century, humanity has entered into the time of images. The sum realised by Gervereau is in the continuity of his book of method See, Understand, Analyse Images (La Découverte, first edition in 1994) and of the reflections about the new and fundamental object of the human contemporary reality, the visual, visual that he has studied through his book History of the Visual in the XXth Century (« Points histoire », Le Seuil, 2000). (...) Today, we entered with the Internet into the "Time of accumulation" and this book seems to be the first attempt to decode this new world of mass images in a global World."
