= Sullivan =

Sullivan may refer to:

== Characters ==
- Chloe Sullivan, from the television series Smallville
- Colin Sullivan, a character in the film The Departed, played by Matt Damon
- Harry Sullivan (Doctor Who), from the British science fiction television series Doctor Who
- James P. "Sulley" Sullivan, a character in the Monsters, Inc. franchise
- John 'Sully' Sullivan, from the television series Third Watch
- John L. Sullivan, protagonist in the film Sullivan's Travels
- Jordan Sullivan, from the television series Scrubs
- Kathy Beale, a fictional character in the British soap opera EastEnders
- Michael Sullivan, a character in the 1996 American legal crime drama movie Sleepers
- Morgan Sullivan, an alias of the fictional protagonist of the film Cypher
- Sam Sullivan, from the television series The Loop
- Sieglinde Sullivan, a character from the manga and anime Black Butler
- Sullivan, a character from the manga and anime Welcome to Demon School! Iruma-kun
- Victor Sullivan, character from the video game Uncharted franchise
- Walter Sullivan (Silent Hill), an antagonist of the video game Silent Hill 4: The Room
- William "Rocky" Sullivan, protagonist in the film Angels with Dirty Faces

== Places ==
=== Canada ===
- Sullivan, Quebec

=== United States ===
- Sullivan, Illinois
- Sullivan, Indiana
- Sullivan, Kentucky
- Sullivan, Maine
- Sullivan, Missouri
- Sullivan, New Hampshire
- Sullivan, New York
- Sullivan, Ohio
- Sullivan, Virginia
- Sullivan, Raleigh County, West Virginia
- Sullivan, Randolph County, West Virginia
- Sullivan (town), Wisconsin
  - Sullivan, Wisconsin, a village within the town
- Sullivan City, Texas

=== Craters ===
- Sullivan (Mercurian crater)
- Sullivan (Venusian crater)

== Music ==
- Sullivan Foundation, a non-profit organization dedicated to finding, developing, and furthering the careers of promising opera singers in the United States
- Sullivan (band), an alternative rock band from Greensboro, North Carolina
- Sir Arthur Sullivan (1842–1900), composer, of the team Gilbert and Sullivan
- "Sullivan" (song), a 1997 song by Caroline's Spine

== Other uses ==
- Sullivan reaction, a chemical reaction
- Sullivan Expedition, a United States Revolutionary War offensive against the Seneca Nation of Indians
- Silky Sullivan, racehorse
- New York Times Co. v. Sullivan, a United States Supreme Court case
- Sullivan & Company, a brand engagement firm
- Sullivan's Index, a health metric
- Sullivan (play), a comedy by Anne-Honoré-Joseph Duveyrier de Mélésville

== See also ==
- Sulivan, a surname
- Sullavan
- O'Sullivan (disambiguation)
- Sullivan County (disambiguation)
- Sullivan Township (disambiguation)
- Justice Sullivan (disambiguation)
