= Sulivan =

Sulivan is a surname. Notable people with the surname include:

- Bartholomew Sulivan (1810–1890), English sailor and hydrographer
- Laurence Sulivan (1713–1786), British East India Company director and politician
- Laurence Sulivan (1783–1866), Deputy Secretary at War, grandson of the above
- Timothy Sulivan (born 1946), British Army general

== See also ==
- Lake Sulivan, a lake of the Falkland Islands
- Mount Sulivan, a mountain of the Falkland Islands
- Sullivan (disambiguation)
