= List of Polish voivodeships by life expectancy =

Poland is administratively divided into 16 voivodeships.

According to estimation of Statistics Poland, life expectancy at birth in Poland in 2023 was 78.21 years (74.65 years for male and 81.99 years for female).
Healthy life expectancy was 61.3 years for men and 64.6 years for women.

According to alternative estimation of the United Nations, in 2023 life expectancy in Poland was 78.63 years (74.88 for male, 82.35 for female).

Estimation of the World Bank Group for 2023: 78.51 years total (74.80 for male, 82.40 for female).

Estimation of Eurostat for 2023: 78.4 years total (74.6 for male, 82.1 for female).

According to estimation of the WHO for 2019, at that year life expectancy in Poland was 77.73 years (73.94 years for male and 81.50 years for female).
And healthy life expectancy was 67.56 years (65.08 years for male and 70.01 years for female).

Life expectancy in Poland as of 2023 is lower than in neighboring Czechia, Germany, Finland, and Sweden. It is roughly on par with Estonia. And it is higher than in neighboring Slovakia, Hungary, Latvia, Lithuania, Belorussia, and Ukraine.

== Eurostat (2014—2023) ==
The division of Poland into territorial units of the 2nd level (NUTS 2) almost coincides with the division of the country into voivodeships. Exception is the Masovian Voivodeship that is divided into two NUTS2 regions: the Warsaw metropolitan area and Masovian Regional. By default, the table is sorted by 2023.

code	voivodeship	2014				2014 →2019	2019				2019 →2023	2023				2014 →2023
code	voivodeship	overall	male	female	F Δ M	2014 →2019	overall	male	female	F Δ M	2019 →2023	overall	male	female	F Δ M	2014 →2023
	Poland on average	77.8	73.7	81.7	8.0	0.2	78.0	74.1	81.9	7.8	0.4	78.4	74.6	82.1	7.5	0.6
PL82	Subcarpathian Voivodeship	79.0	75.0	83.0	8.0	0.4	79.4	75.4	83.4	8.0	0.4	79.8	75.9	83.7	7.8	0.8
PL21	Lesser Poland Voivodeship	79.1	75.3	82.7	7.4	0.1	79.2	75.4	82.9	7.5	0.5	79.7	76.1	83.2	7.1	0.6
PL91	Warsaw metropolitan area	79.3	75.5	82.7	7.2	0.2	79.5	75.8	82.9	7.1	0.1	79.6	76.2	82.7	6.5	0.3
PL84	Podlaskie Voivodeship	78.4	73.9	83.1	9.2	0.3	78.7	74.2	83.3	9.1	0.2	78.9	74.5	83.4	8.9	0.5
PL52	Opole Voivodeship	78.1	74.4	81.6	7.2	0.1	78.2	74.4	82.1	7.7	0.6	78.8	75.2	82.5	7.3	0.7
PL63	Pomeranian Voivodeship	78.2	74.4	82.0	7.6	0.3	78.5	74.9	82.0	7.1	0.2	78.7	75.2	82.2	7.0	0.5
PL81	Lublin Voivodeship	77.8	73.2	82.4	9.2	0.4	78.2	73.9	82.6	8.7	0.2	78.4	74.2	82.7	8.5	0.6
PL41	Greater Poland Voivodeship	77.8	74.0	81.5	7.5	0.3	78.1	74.4	81.7	7.3	0.2	78.3	74.8	81.8	7.0	0.5
PL51	Lower Silesian Voivodeship	77.4	73.1	81.5	8.4	0.1	77.5	73.5	81.5	8.0	0.6	78.1	74.3	81.9	7.6	0.7
PL72	Świętokrzyskie Voivodeship	77.9	73.6	82.2	8.6	0.1	78.0	73.8	82.4	8.6	0.0	78.0	73.7	82.5	8.8	0.1
PL43	Lubusz Voivodeship	77.4	73.3	81.3	8.0	−0.5	76.9	72.9	81.0	8.1	1.0	77.9	74.0	81.7	7.7	0.5
PL22	Silesian Voivodeship	77.0	73.3	80.6	7.3	0.5	77.5	74.0	81.0	7.0	0.3	77.8	74.3	81.3	7.0	0.8
PL42	West Pomeranian Voivodeship	77.6	73.6	81.4	7.8	−0.1	77.5	73.7	81.3	7.6	0.2	77.7	74.0	81.5	7.5	0.1
PL61	Kuyavian–Pomeranian Voivodeship	77.5	73.4	81.4	8.0	0.0	77.5	73.8	81.2	7.4	0.2	77.7	74.0	81.4	7.4	0.2
PL62	Warmian–Masurian Voivodeship	77.4	73.0	81.7	8.7	−0.2	77.2	72.9	81.4	8.5	0.5	77.7	73.7	81.7	8.0	0.3
PL92	Masovian Regional	76.8	72.4	81.4	9.0	0.2	77.0	72.7	81.7	9.0	0.3	77.3	73.2	81.7	8.5	0.5
PL71	Łódź Voivodeship	76.3	71.6	80.9	9.3	0.6	76.9	72.6	81.2	8.6	0.4	77.3	73.1	81.4	8.3	1.0

Data source: Eurostat

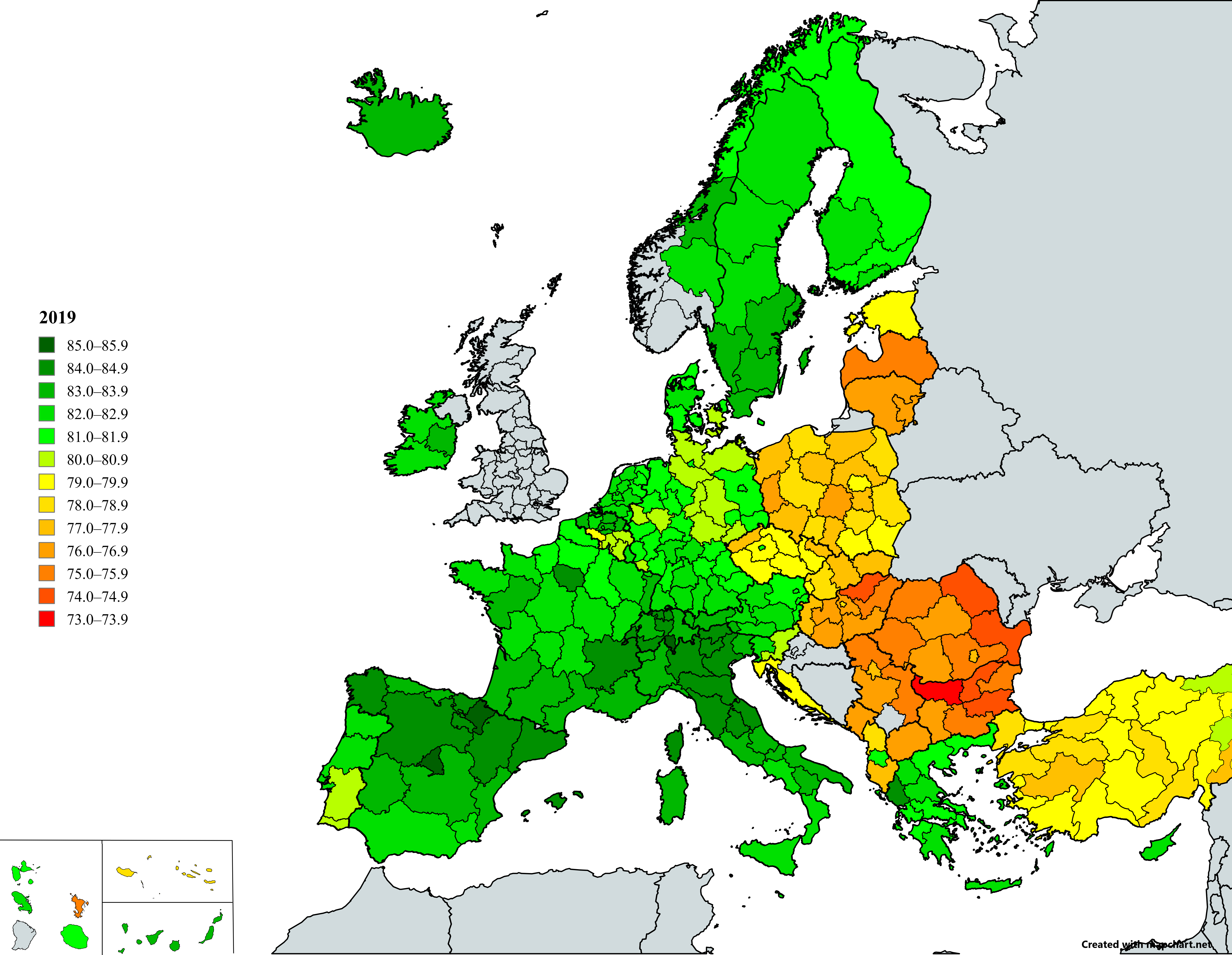
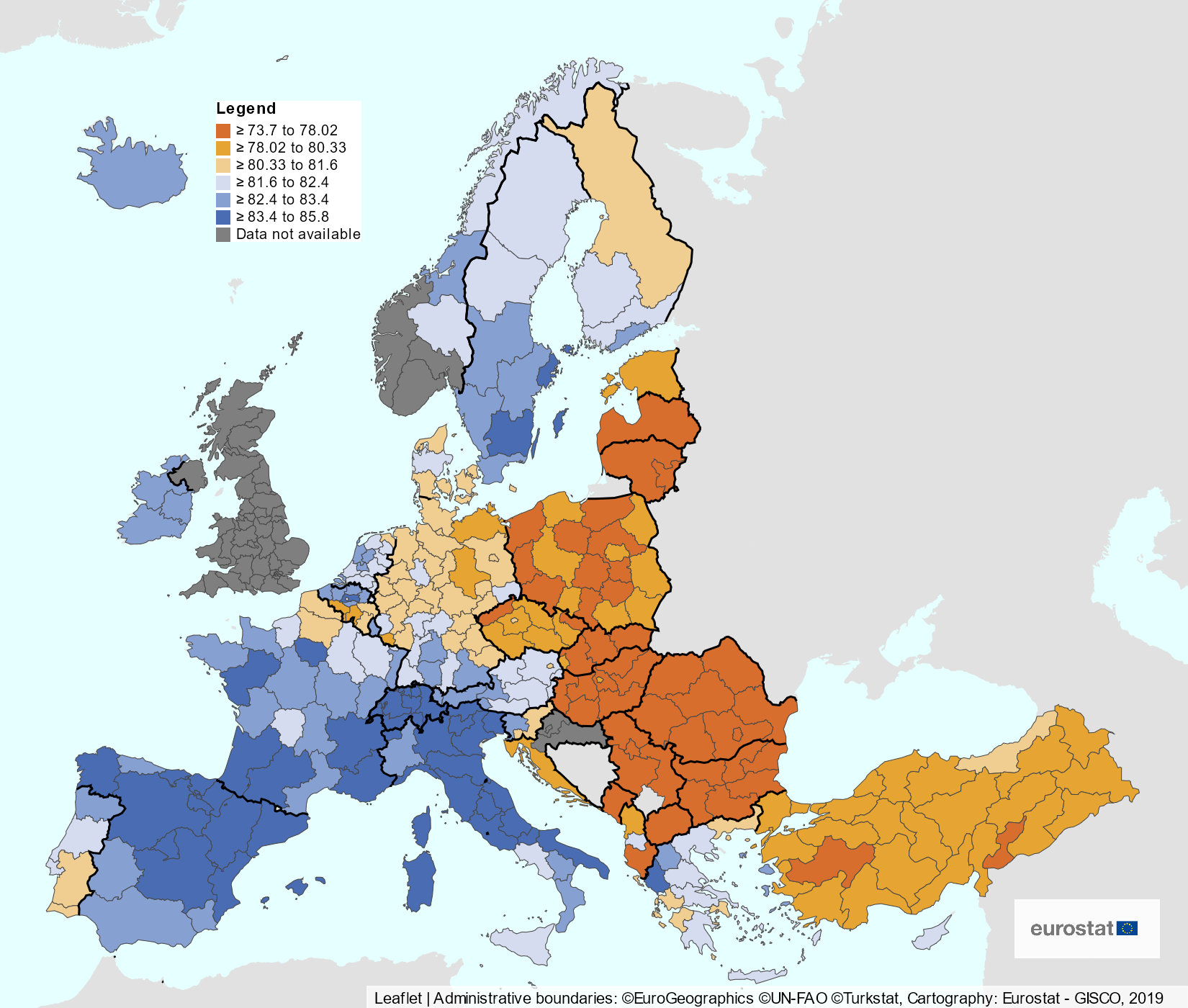
Life expectancy in the Polish voivodeships in comparison with regions of other European countries in 2019, according to Eurostat

== Global Data Lab (2019–2022) ==
region	2019				2019 →2021	2021	2021 →2022	2022				2019 →2022
region	overall	male	female	F Δ M	2019 →2021	overall	2021 →2022	overall	male	female	F Δ M	2019 →2022
Poland on average	77.93	74.08	81.74	7.66	−1.47	76.46	0.54	77.00	73.23	80.80	7.57	−0.93
Lesser Poland Voivodeship	79.14	75.39	82.77	7.38	−1.13	78.01	0.32	78.33	74.71	82.02	7.31	−0.81
Subcarpathian Voivodeship	79.34	75.39	83.27	7.88	−2.04	77.30	1.03	78.33	74.51	82.22	7.71	−1.01
Podlaskie Voivodeship	78.64	74.19	83.17	8.98	−2.25	76.39	1.34	77.73	73.31	82.22	8.91	−0.91
Masovian Voivodeship	78.36	74.45	82.25	7.80	−1.69	76.67	0.93	77.60	73.78	81.35	7.57	−0.76
Opole Voivodeship	78.14	74.39	81.97	7.58	−1.34	76.80	0.53	77.33	73.31	81.32	8.01	−0.81
Pomeranian Voivodeship	78.44	74.89	81.87	6.98	−1.24	77.20	0.03	77.23	73.71	80.72	7.01	−1.21
Greater Poland Voivodeship	78.04	74.39	81.57	7.18	−1.34	76.70	0.43	77.13	73.51	80.72	7.21	−0.91
Lublin Voivodeship	78.14	73.89	82.47	8.58	−2.05	76.09	1.04	77.13	73.01	81.32	8.31	−1.01
Świętokrzyskie Voivodeship	77.94	73.79	82.27	8.48	−1.55	76.39	0.44	76.83	72.61	81.22	8.61	−1.11
Kuyavian–Pomeranian Voivodeship	77.44	73.79	81.07	7.28	−1.55	75.89	0.74	76.63	73.21	80.03	6.82	−0.81
Lower Silesian Voivodeship	77.44	73.49	81.37	7.88	−1.15	76.29	0.24	76.53	72.71	80.43	7.72	−0.91
West Pomeranian Voivodeship	77.44	73.69	81.17	7.48	−1.35	76.09	0.44	76.53	72.61	80.43	7.82	−0.91
Silesian Voivodeship	77.44	73.99	80.87	6.88	−1.55	75.89	0.54	76.43	72.91	80.03	7.12	−1.01
Lubusz Voivodeship	76.84	72.89	80.87	7.98	−1.46	75.38	0.95	76.33	72.51	80.13	7.62	−0.51
Warmian–Masurian Voivodeship	77.14	72.89	81.27	8.38	−1.45	75.69	0.54	76.23	72.31	80.33	8.02	−0.91
Łódź Voivodeship	76.84	72.59	81.07	8.48	−1.26	75.58	0.35	75.93	72.01	79.73	7.72	−0.91

Data source: Global Data Lab

== Statistics Poland ==
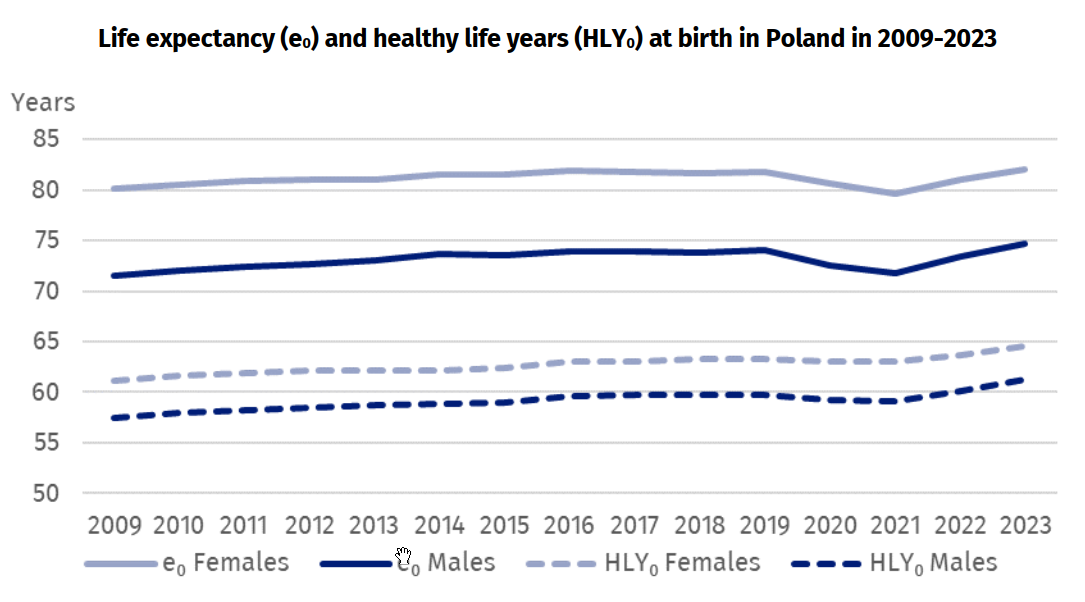
Development of life expectancy and healthy life years in Poland

Data sources: Statistics Poland

== Charts ==
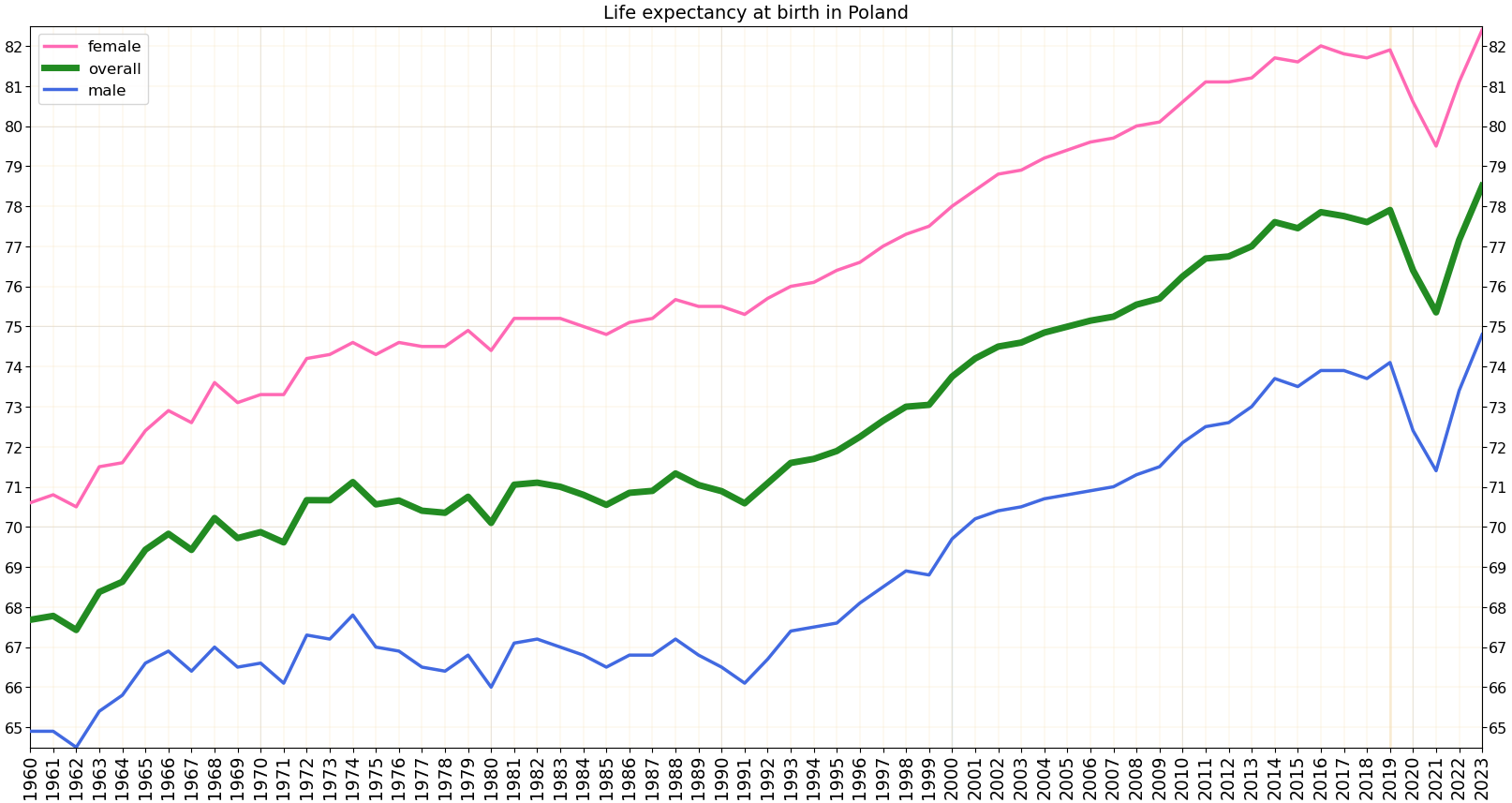
Development of life expectancy in Poland according to estimation of the World Bank Group

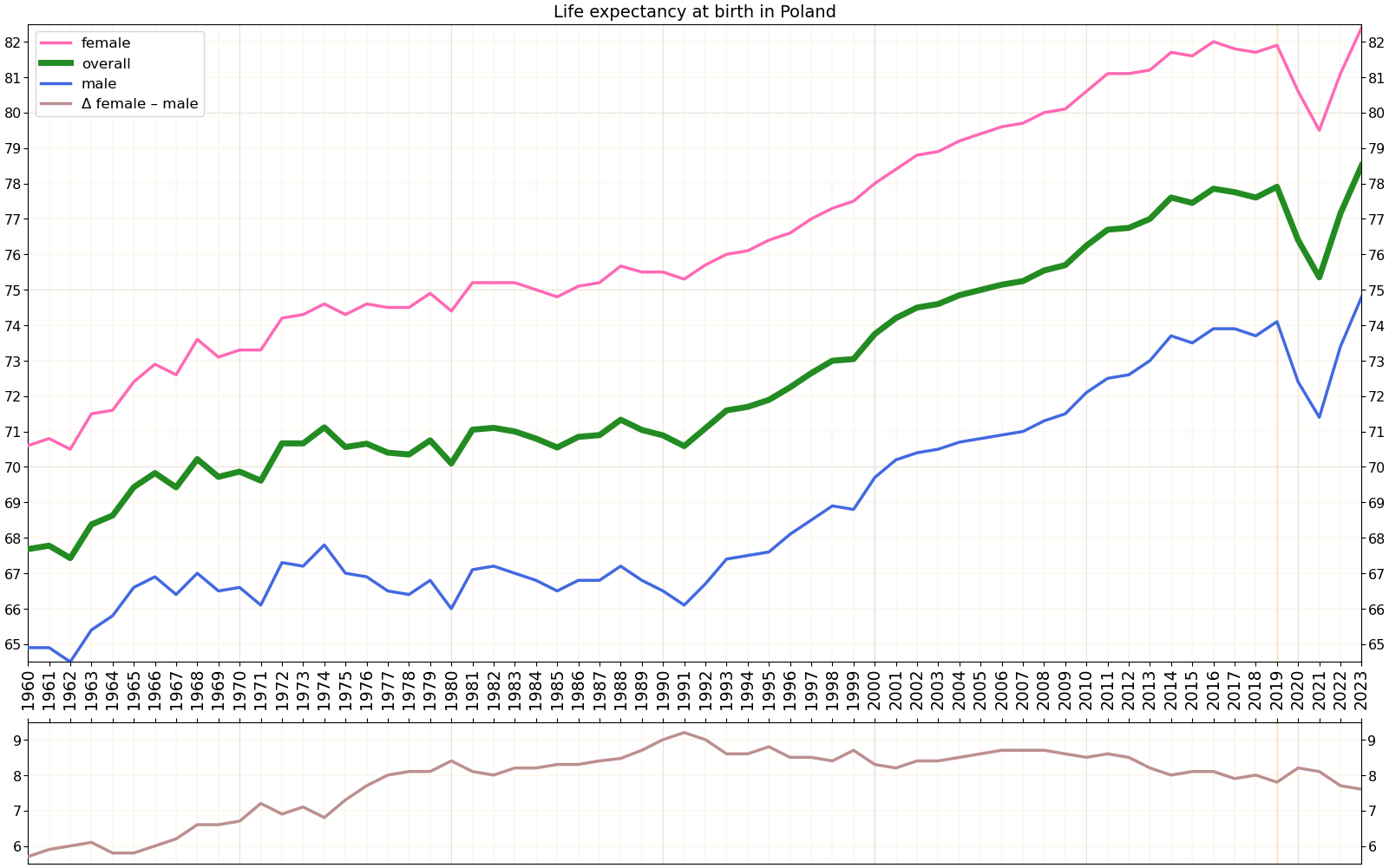
Life expectancy with calculated sex gap

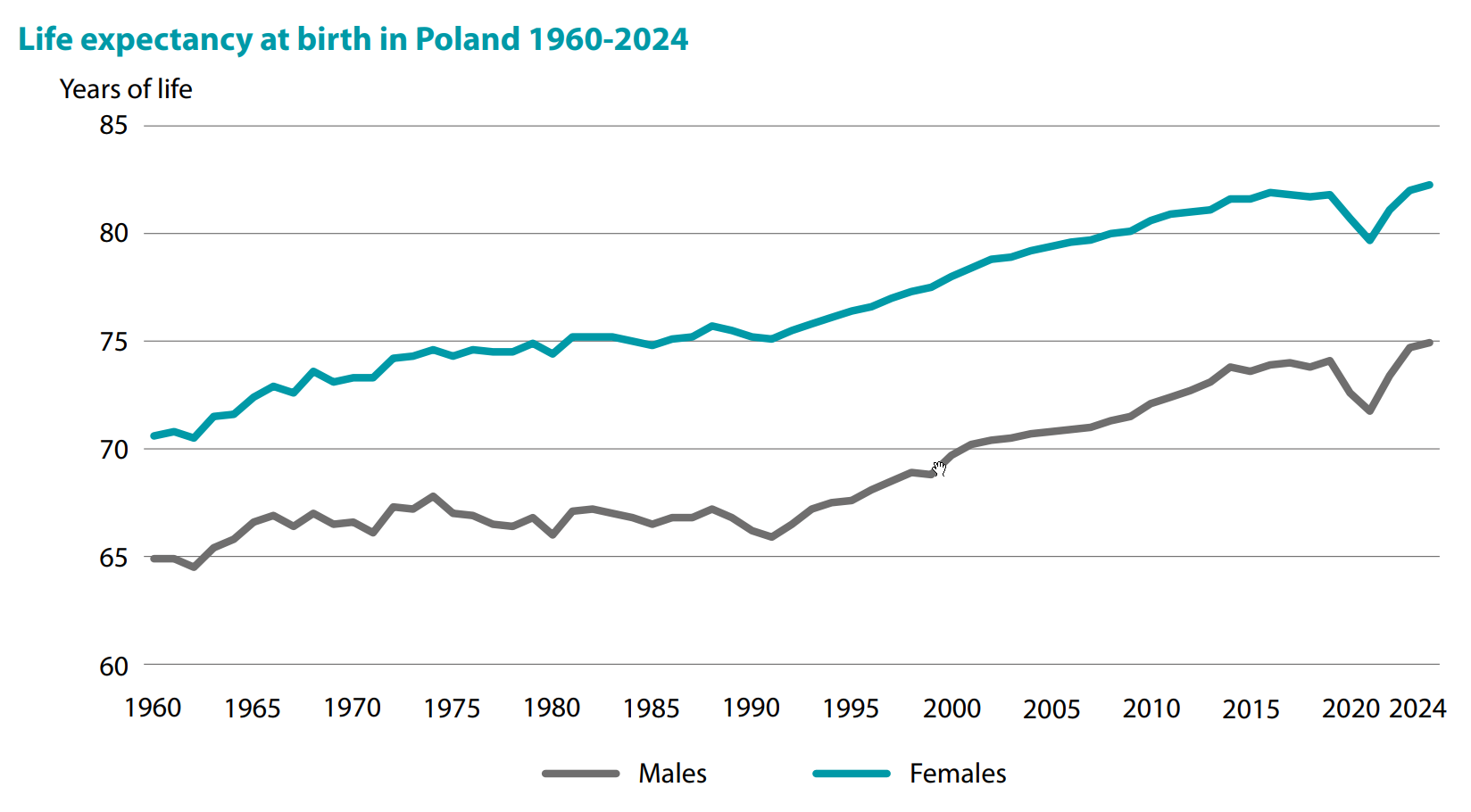
Life expectancy at birth in Poland, according to the data of Statistics Poland

Life expectancy in Poland according to estimation of Our World in Data

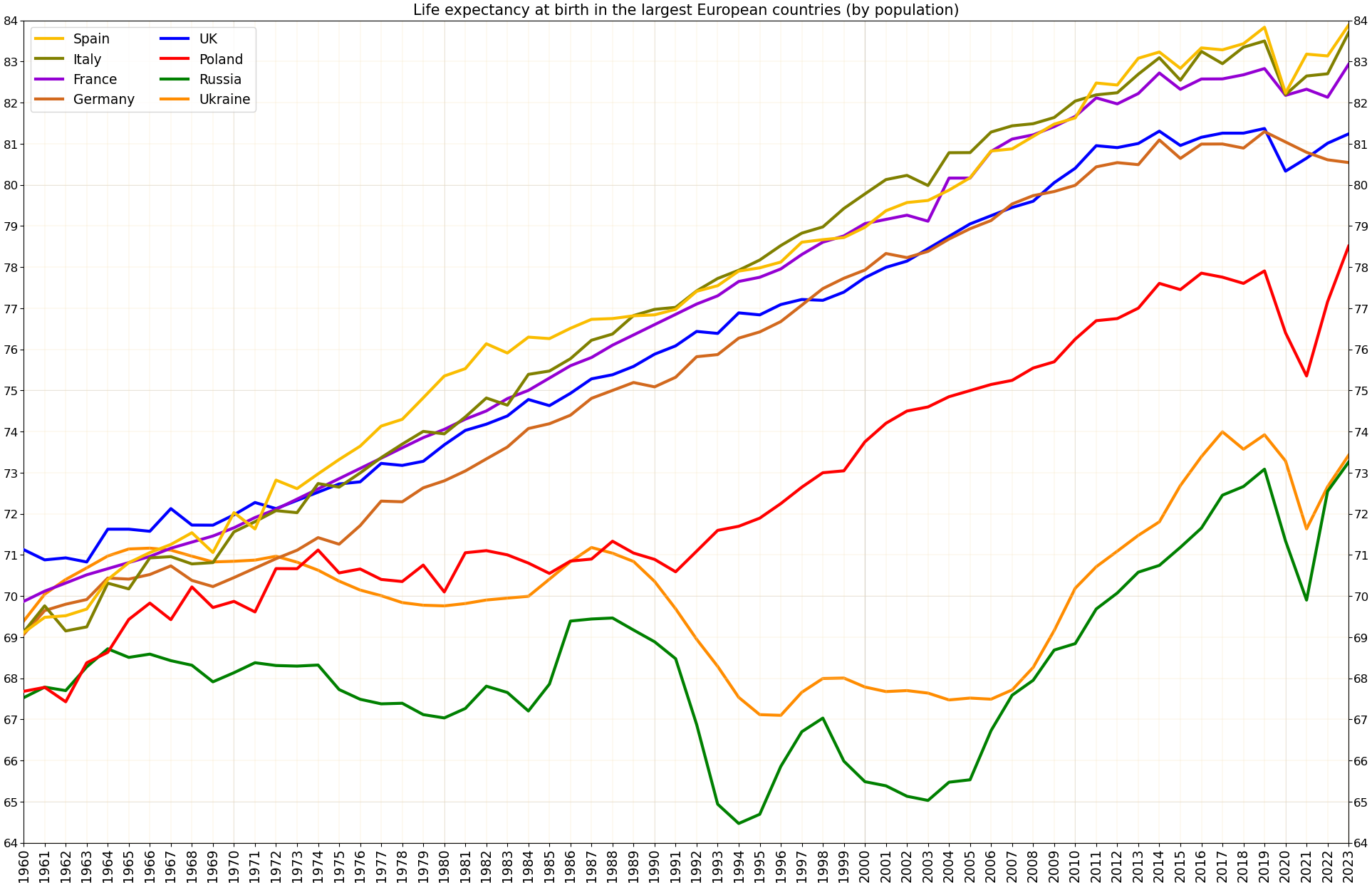
Development of life expectancy in Poland in comparison to the largest by population European countries
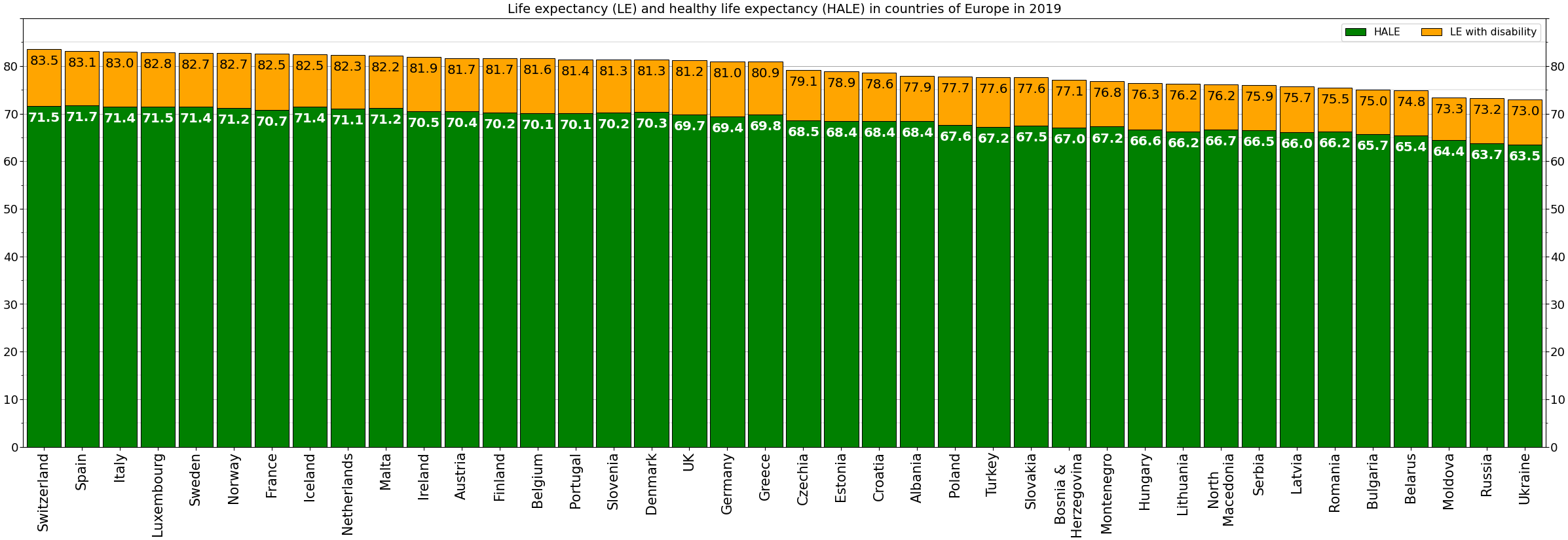
Life expectancy and healthy life expectancy in Poland on the background of other countries of Europe in 2019

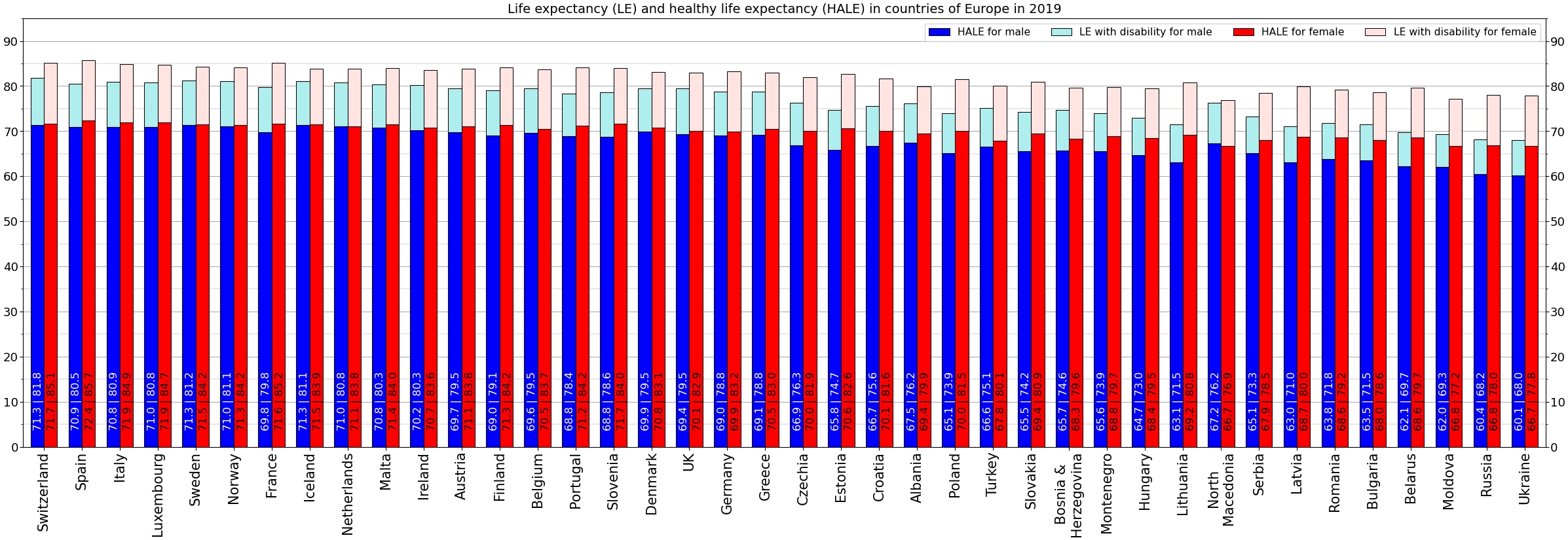
Life expectancy and healthy life expectancy for males and females separately

== See also ==
- List of countries by life expectancy
- List of European countries by life expectancy
- Demographics of Poland
