= Sullivan Township, Illinois =

Sullivan Township, Illinois may refer to one of the following townships:

- Sullivan Township, Livingston County, Illinois
- Sullivan Township, Moultrie County, Illinois

See also

- Sullivan Township (disambiguation)
