= HLY =

HLY may refer to:

- Healthy Life Years
- Holytown railway station, in Scotland
- Hong Leong Yamaha, a Malaysian motorcycle distributor
- hly, a gene encoding Listeriolysin O
