= O'Sullivan =

O'Sullivan may refer to:

== People ==
- O'Sullivan family, a gaelic Irish clan
- O'Sullivan (surname), a family name
- Sullivan (surname), a variation of the O'Sullivan family name

== Places ==
- O'Sullivan Dam, Washington, United States
- O'Sullivan Army Heliport, California, United States
- O'Sullivan Beach, South Australia
- O'Sullivan Peak (Utah), United States
- O'Sullivan River, Quebec, Canada

== Other uses ==
- O'Sullivan College, a private university in Canada
- O'Sullivan Ladies Open, an LPGA golf tournament
- O'Sullivan test, a diabetes screening test
- O'Sullivan v Noarlunga Meat Ltd, a series of Australian High Court cases

== See also ==
- Sullivan (disambiguation)
