= O'Sullivan Peak (Utah) =

Mountain in Salt Lake County, Utah

- Sunrise Peak
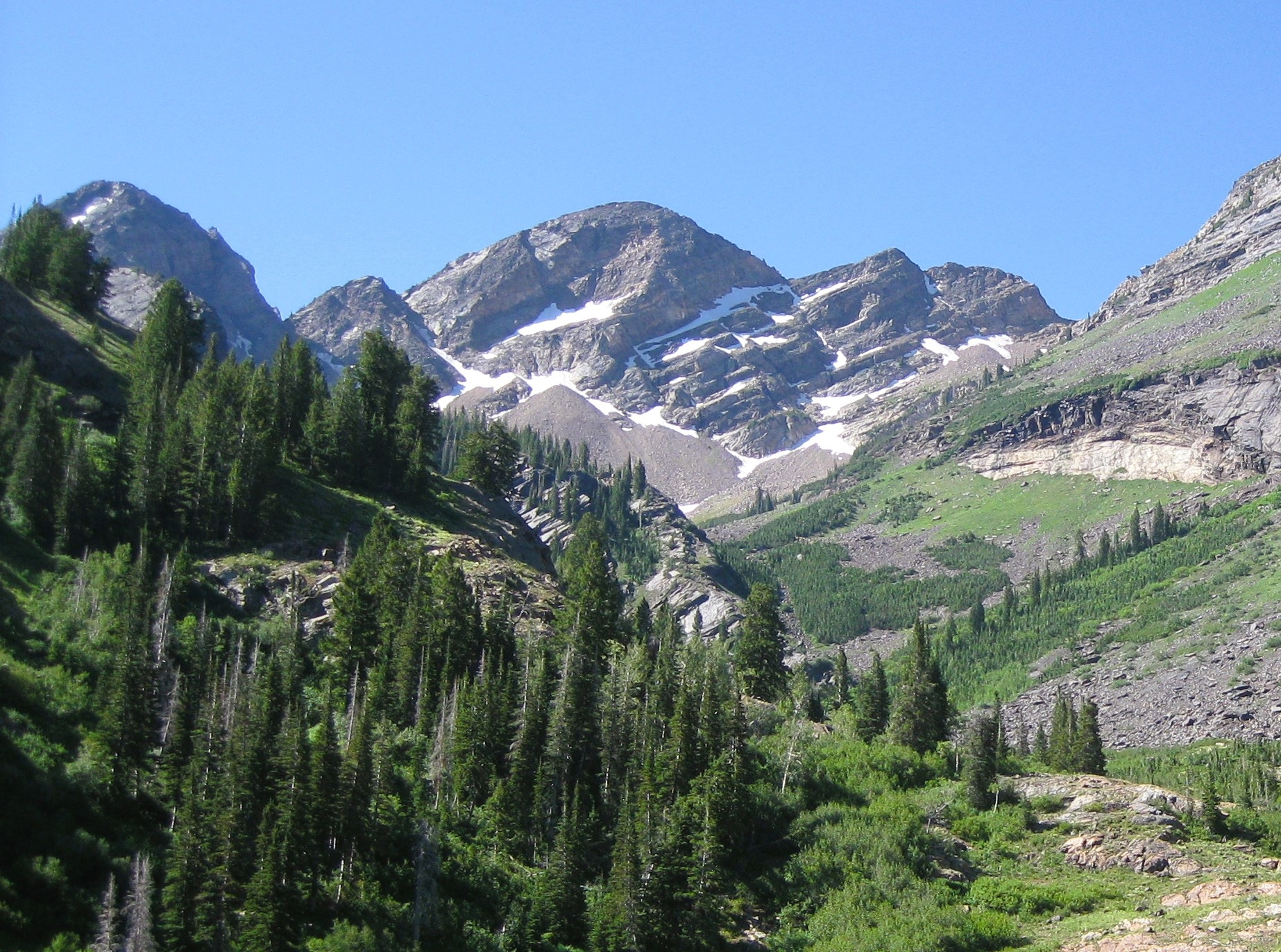
- North aspect

Highest point
- Elevation: 11,275 ft (3,437 m)
- Prominence: 495 ft (151 m)
- Parent peak: Broads Fork Twin Peaks
- Isolation: 0.53 mi (0.85 km)
- Coordinates: 40°35′27″N 111°42′40″W

Naming
- Etymology: Timothy H. O'Sullivan

Geography
- Location within Utah Location within the United States
- Country: United States
- State: Utah
- County: Salt Lake
- Protected area: Twin Peaks Wilderness
- Parent range: Wasatch Range; Rocky Mountains
- Topo map: USGS Dromedary Peak

Climbing
- Easiest route: class 3+ scrambling

O'Sullivan Peak, also known as Sunrise Peak, is an 11,275-foot-elevation (3,437-meter) mountain summit located in Salt Lake County, Utah, United States.

== Description ==
O'Sullivan Peak is located 15 miles (24 km) southeast of downtown Salt Lake City in the Twin Peaks Wilderness on land managed by Wasatch–Cache National Forest. The peak is set in the Wasatch Range which is a subset of the Rocky Mountains. Precipitation runoff from the mountain's south slope drains to Little Cottonwood Creek, whereas the north slope drains to Big Cottonwood Creek, and both creeks flow west to the Jordan River. Topographic relief is significant as the summit rises 4,475 feet (1,364 meters) above Little Cottonwood Canyon in 1.4 mile (2.25 km). This mountain's toponym was officially adopted in 1978 by the United States Board on Geographic Names to remember Timothy H. O'Sullivan (1840–1882), civil war and western frontier photographer who visited this area as the official photographer of the King Survey and Wheeler Survey.

== Gallery ==
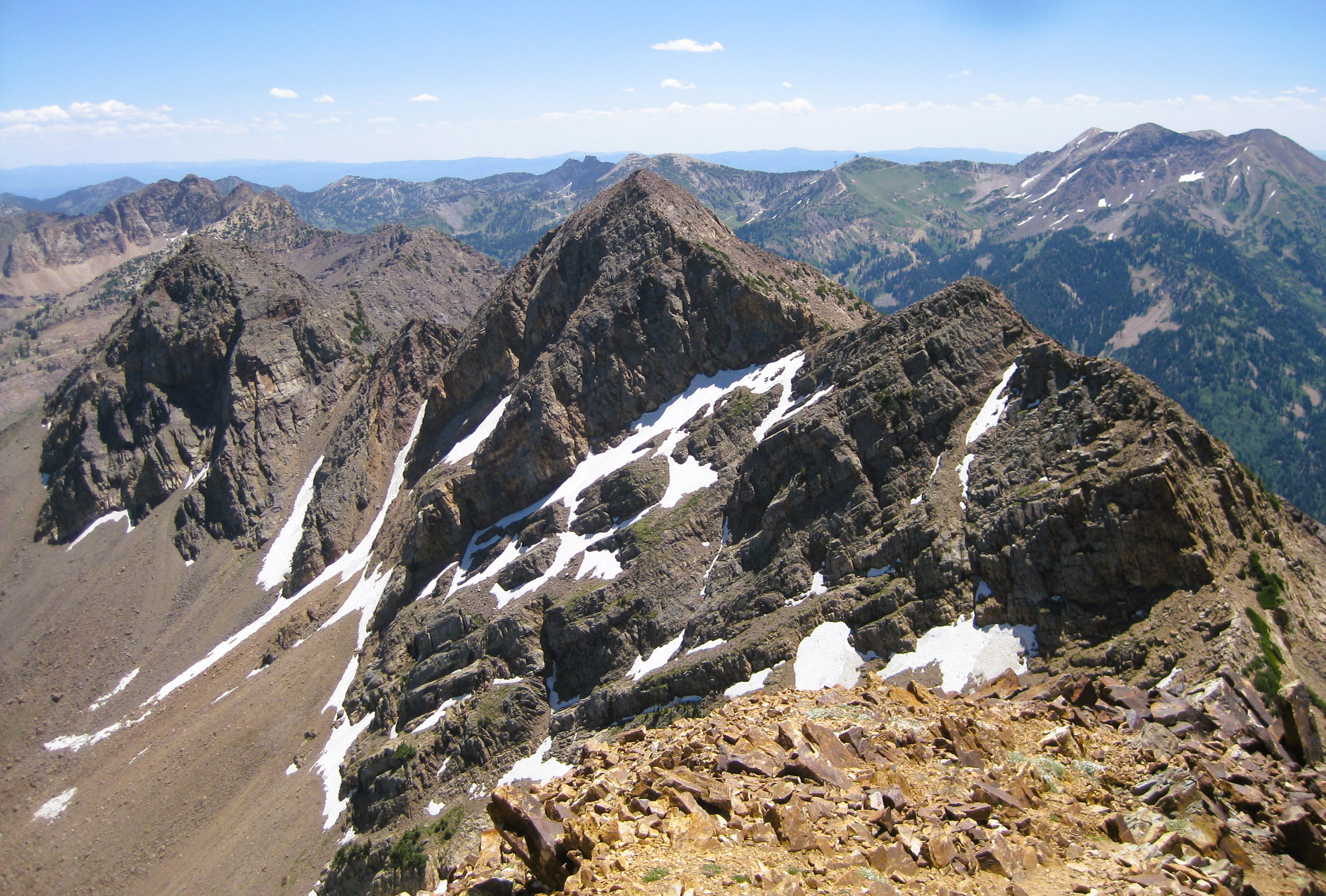
West aspect centered, viewed from Twin Peaks

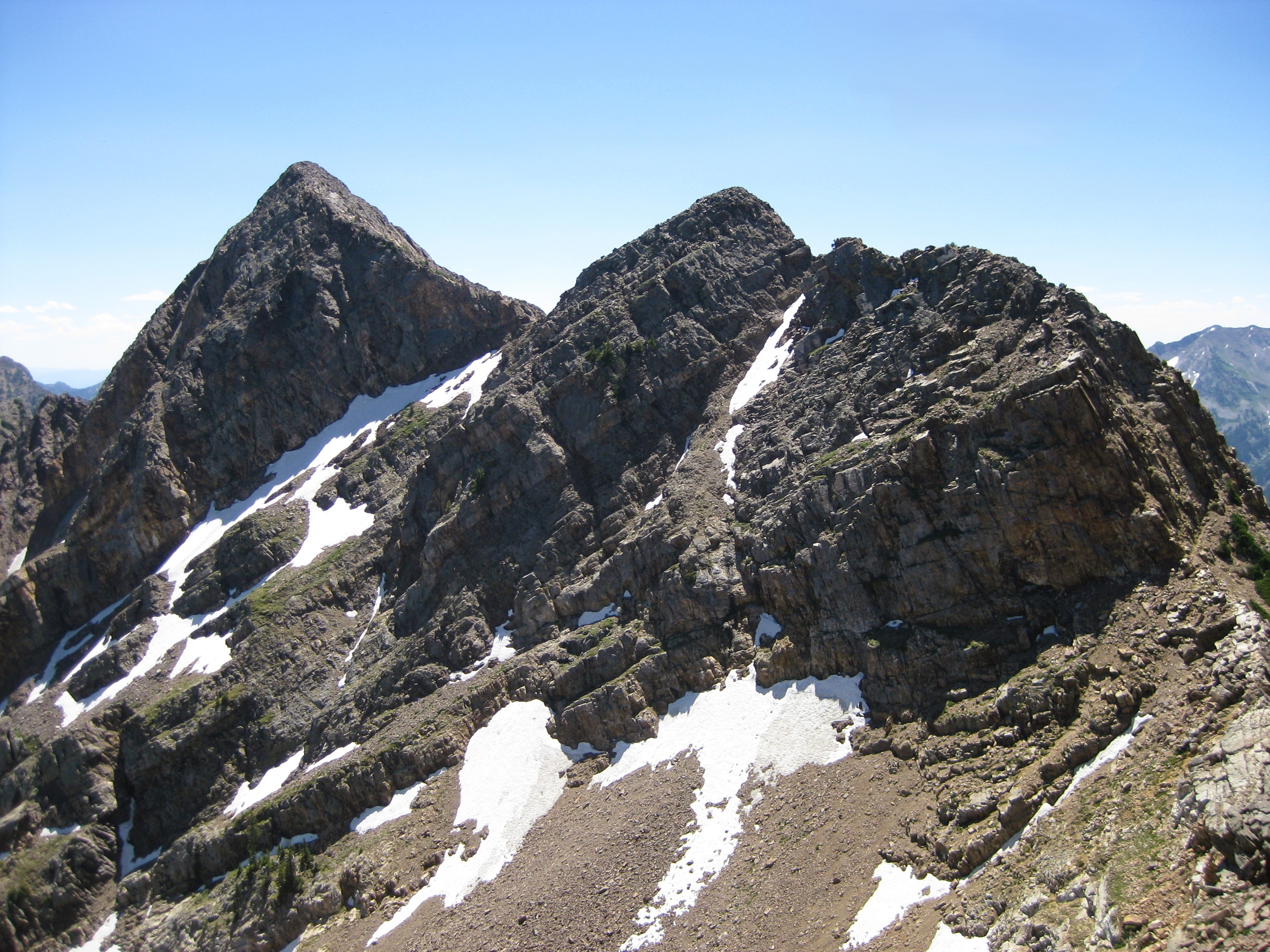
Summit to left

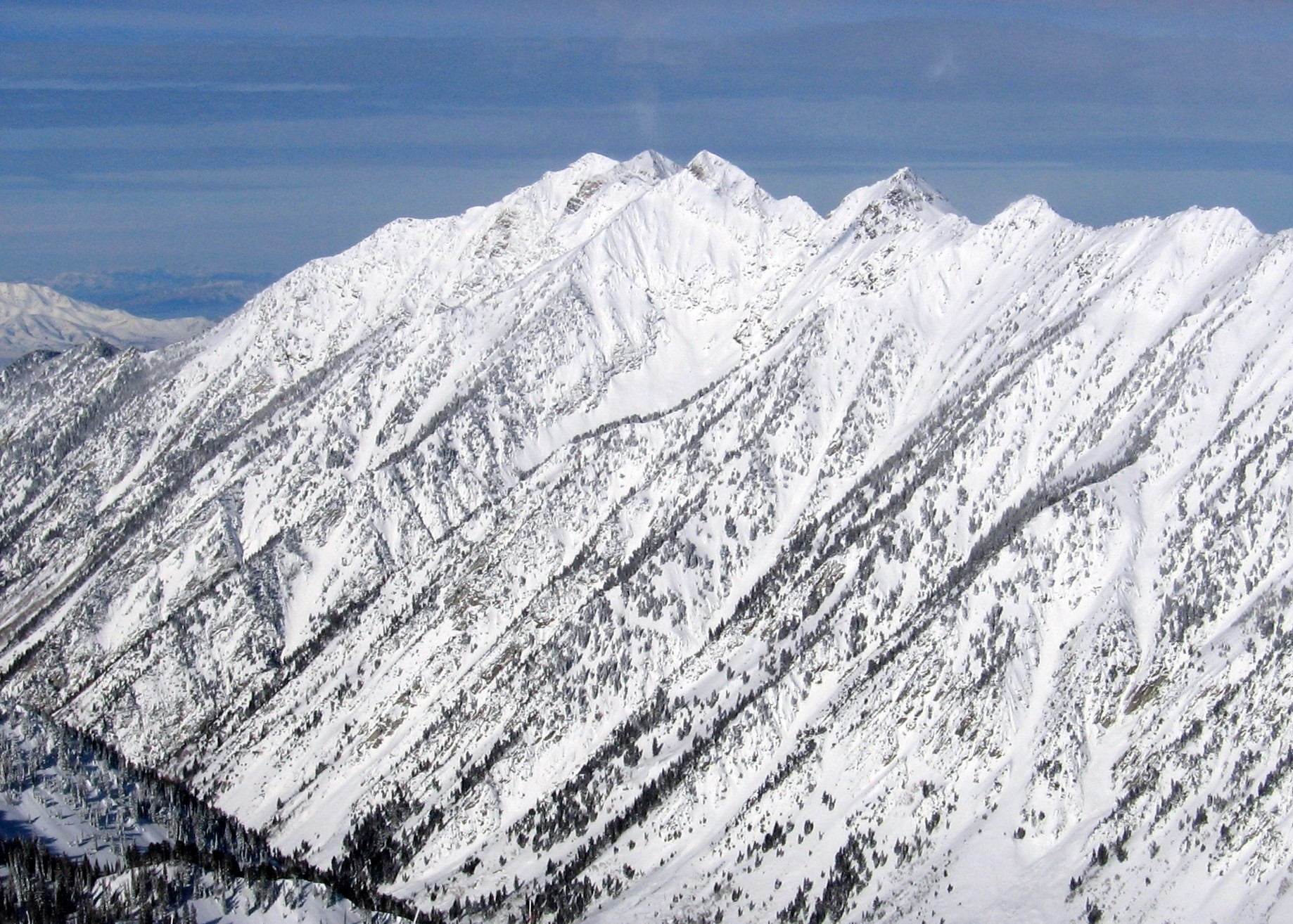
Twin Peaks, O'Sullivan Peak and Dromedary Peak viewed from the southeast from the Snowbird ski area

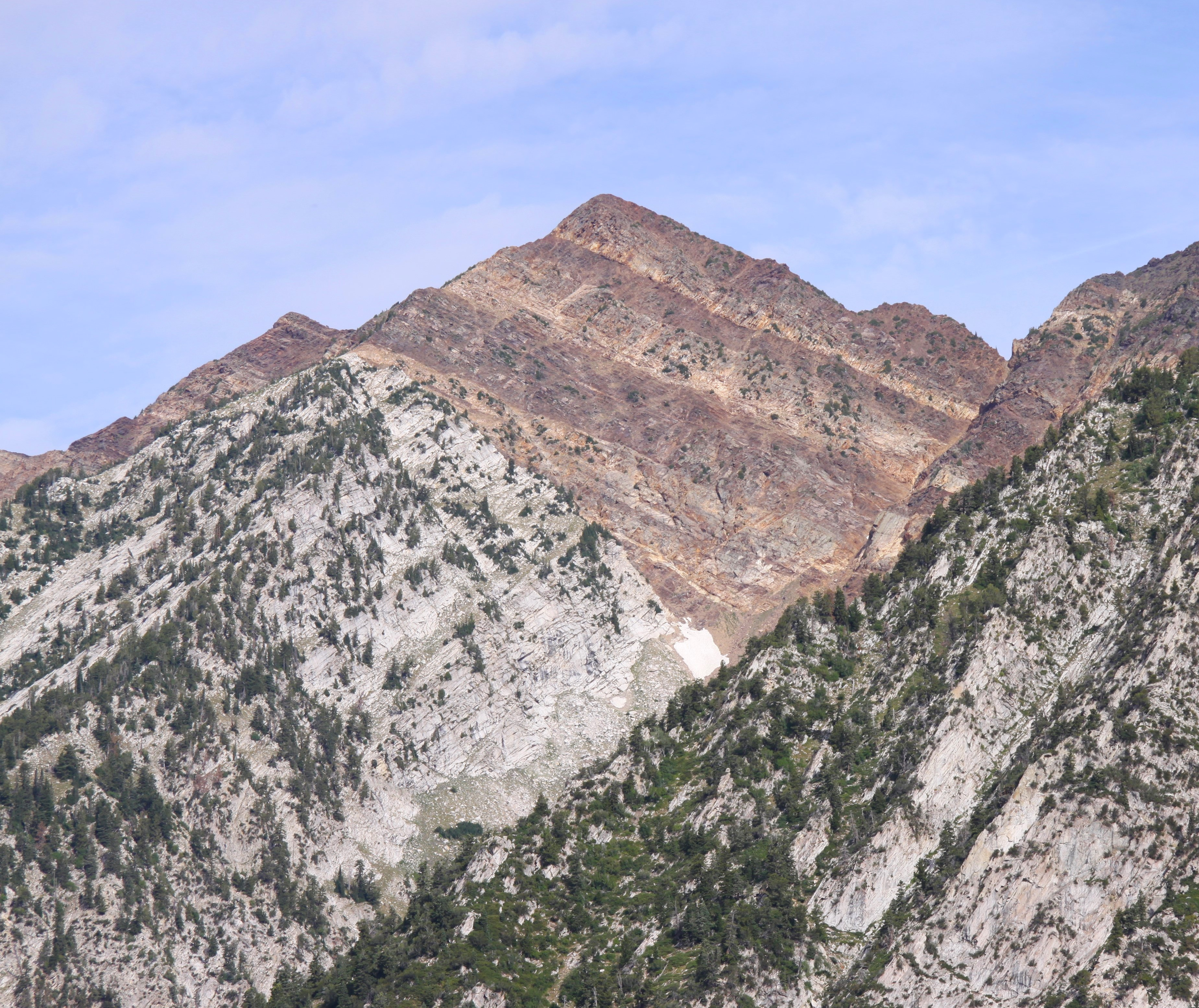
Southeast aspect viewed from Little Cottonwood Canyon

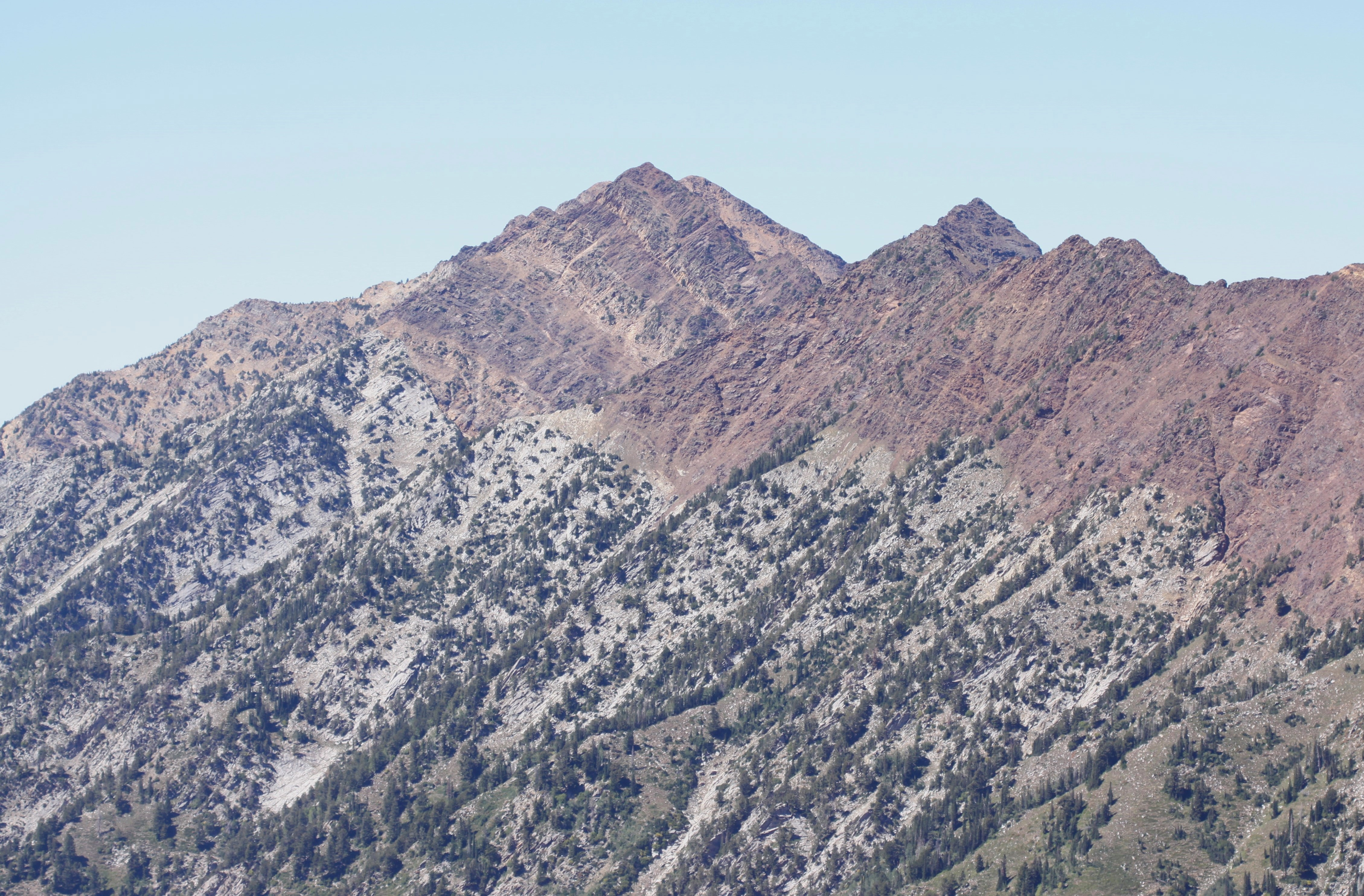
Southeast aspect of O'Sullivan Peak and Dromedary Peak viewed from Germania Pass

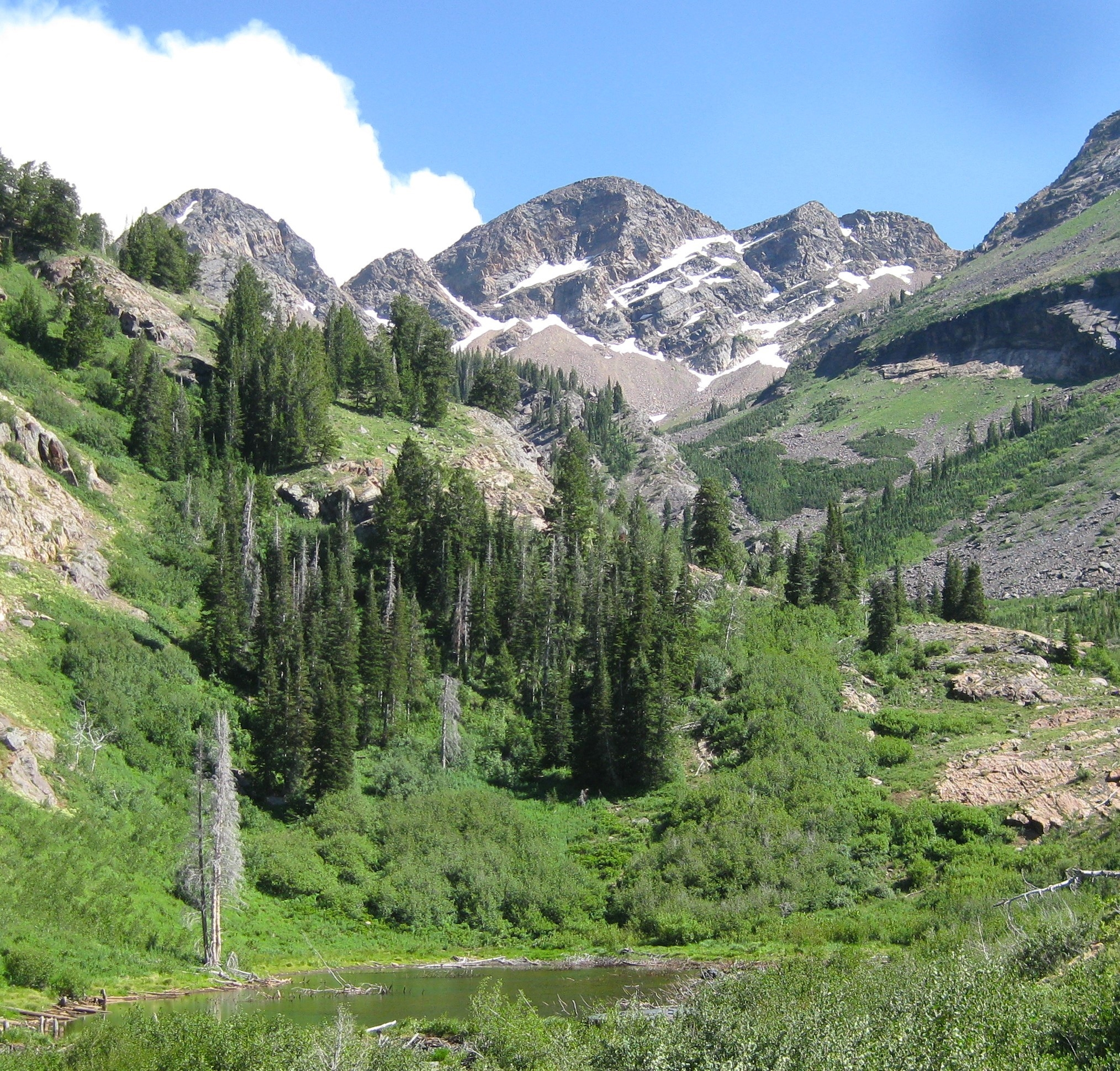
North aspect of O'Sullivan Peak, with Dromedary Peak to the left

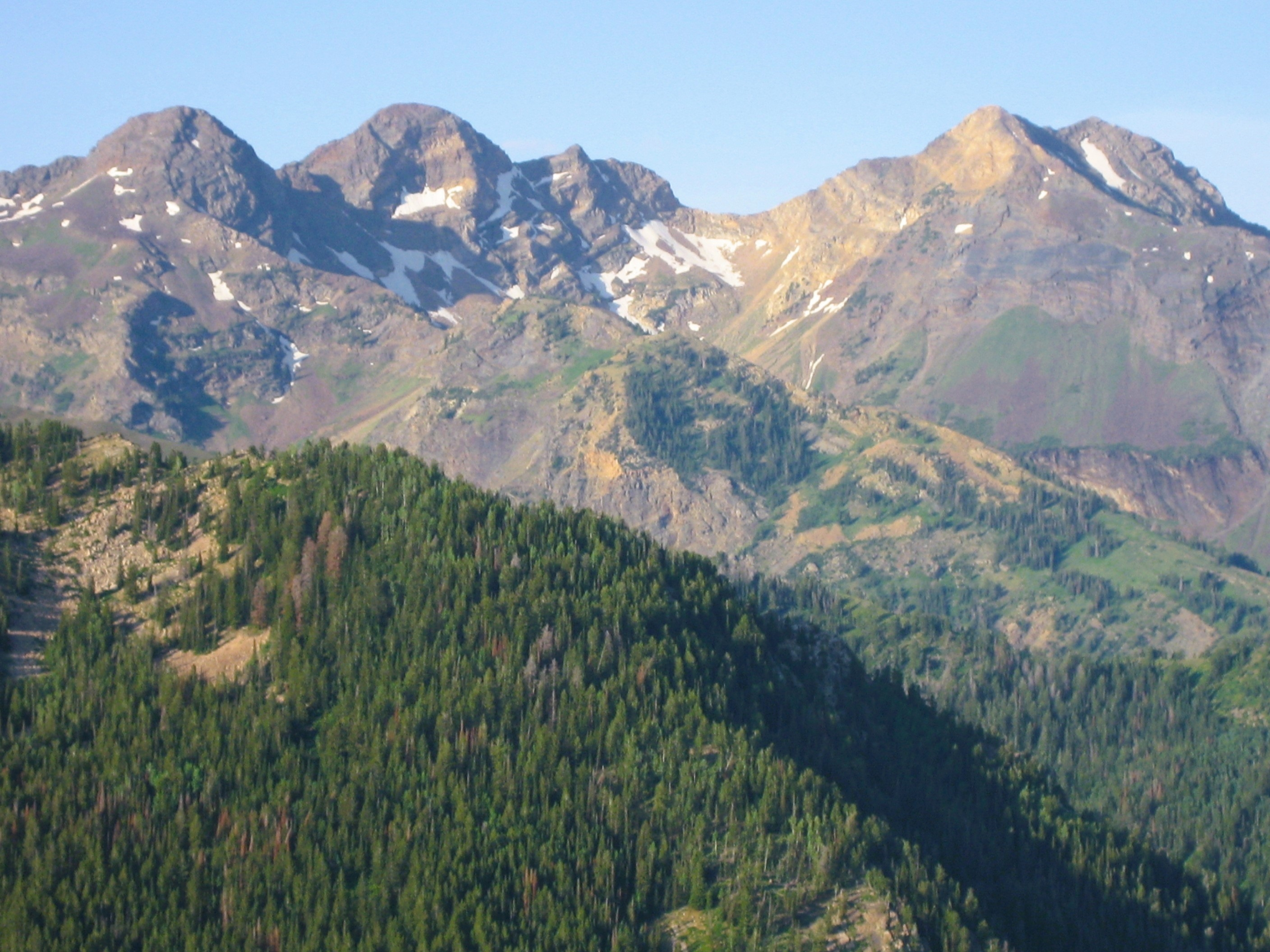
Dromedary Peak (left), O'Sullivan Peak (left of center), Twin Peaks (right) viewed from the north.

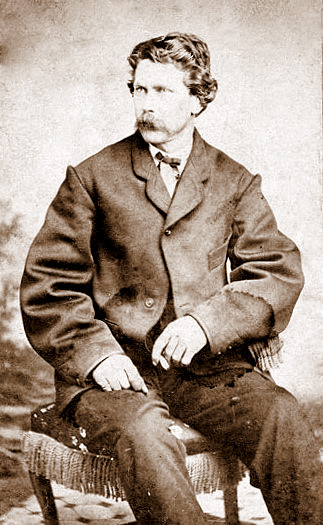
Timothy H. O'Sullivan
