= Dromedary Peak =

Mountain in Utah, United States

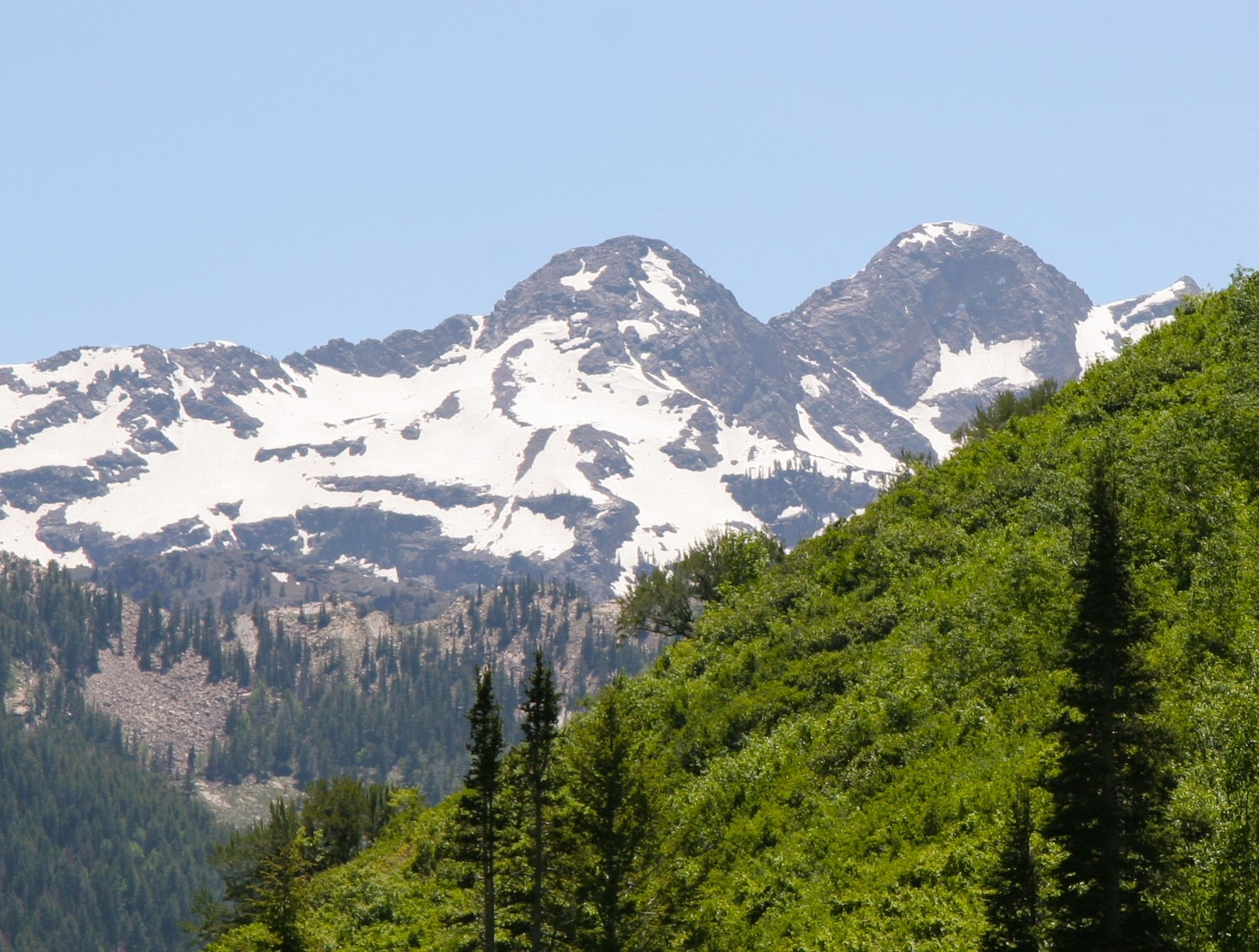
- Northeast aspect, centered (O'Sullivan Peak to right)

Highest point
- Elevation: 11,107 ft (3,385 m)
- Prominence: 367 ft (112 m)
- Parent peak: O'Sullivan Peak
- Isolation: 0.32 mi (0.51 km)
- Coordinates: 40°35′35″N 111°42′22″W

Naming
- Etymology: Dromedary

Geography
- Location within Utah Location within the United States
- Country: United States
- State: Utah
- County: Salt Lake
- Protected area: Twin Peaks Wilderness
- Parent range: Wasatch Range; Rocky Mountains
- Topo map: USGS Dromedary Peak

Geology
- Rock type: Quartzite

Climbing
- Easiest route: class 3 scrambling

Dromedary Peak is an 11,107-foot-elevation (3,385-meter) mountain summit located in Salt Lake County, Utah, United States.

== Description ==
Dromedary Peak is located 15 miles (24 km) southeast of downtown Salt Lake City in the Twin Peaks Wilderness on land managed by Wasatch–Cache National Forest. The peak is set in the Wasatch Range which is a subrange of the Rocky Mountains. Precipitation runoff from the mountain's south slope drains to Little Cottonwood Creek, whereas the north slope drains to Big Cottonwood Creek, and both creeks flow west to the Jordan River. Topographic relief is significant as the summit rises 3,800 feet (1,158 meters) above Little Cottonwood Canyon in 1.5 mile (2.4 km). This mountain's toponym has been officially adopted by the United States Board on Geographic Names. The descriptive name is because the peak's shape resembles a dromedary camel when viewed from a certain angle.

== See also ==
- List of mountains in Utah

== Gallery ==
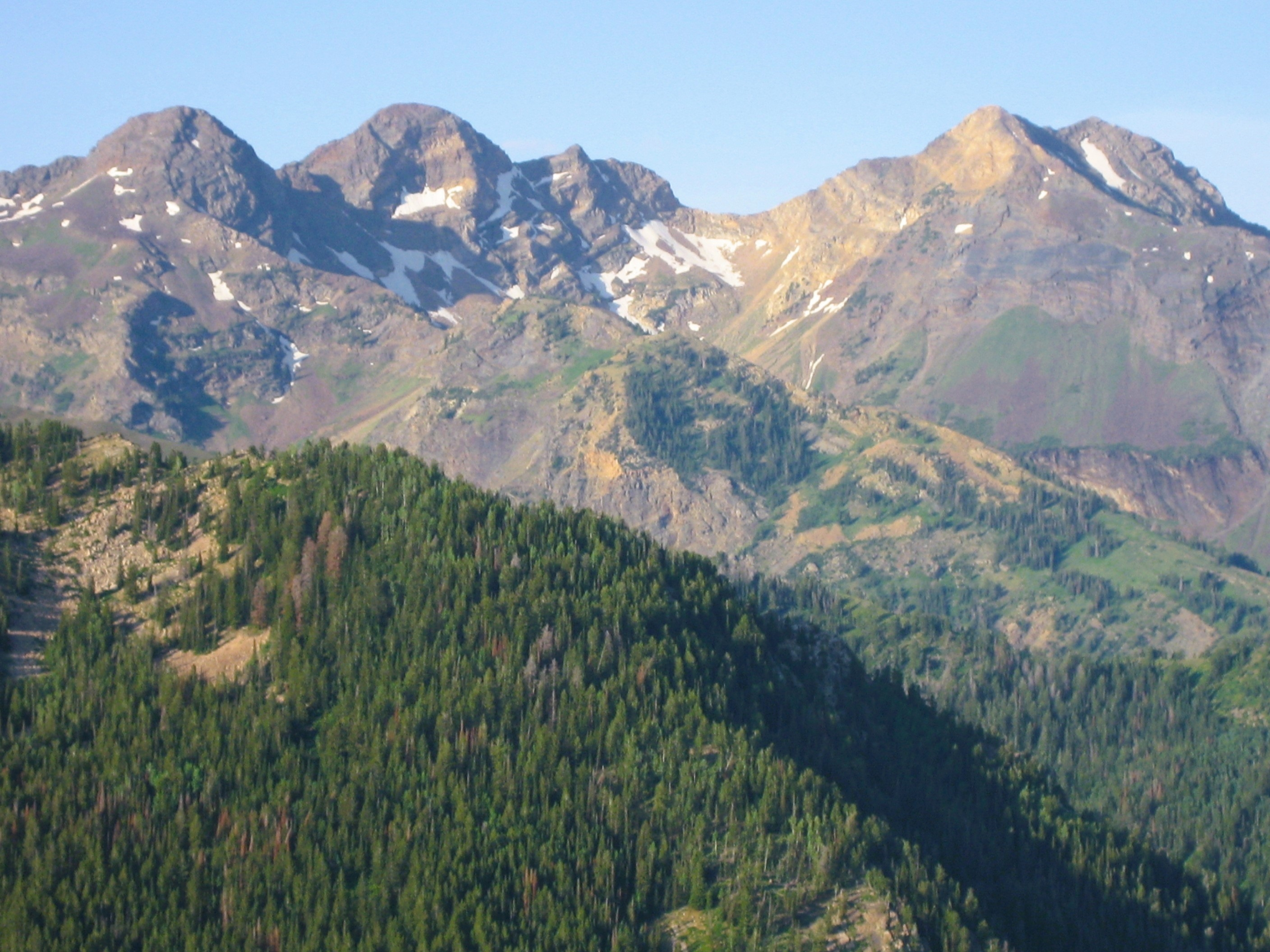
Dromedary Peak (left), O'Sullivan Peak (left of center), Twin Peaks (right) viewed from the north.

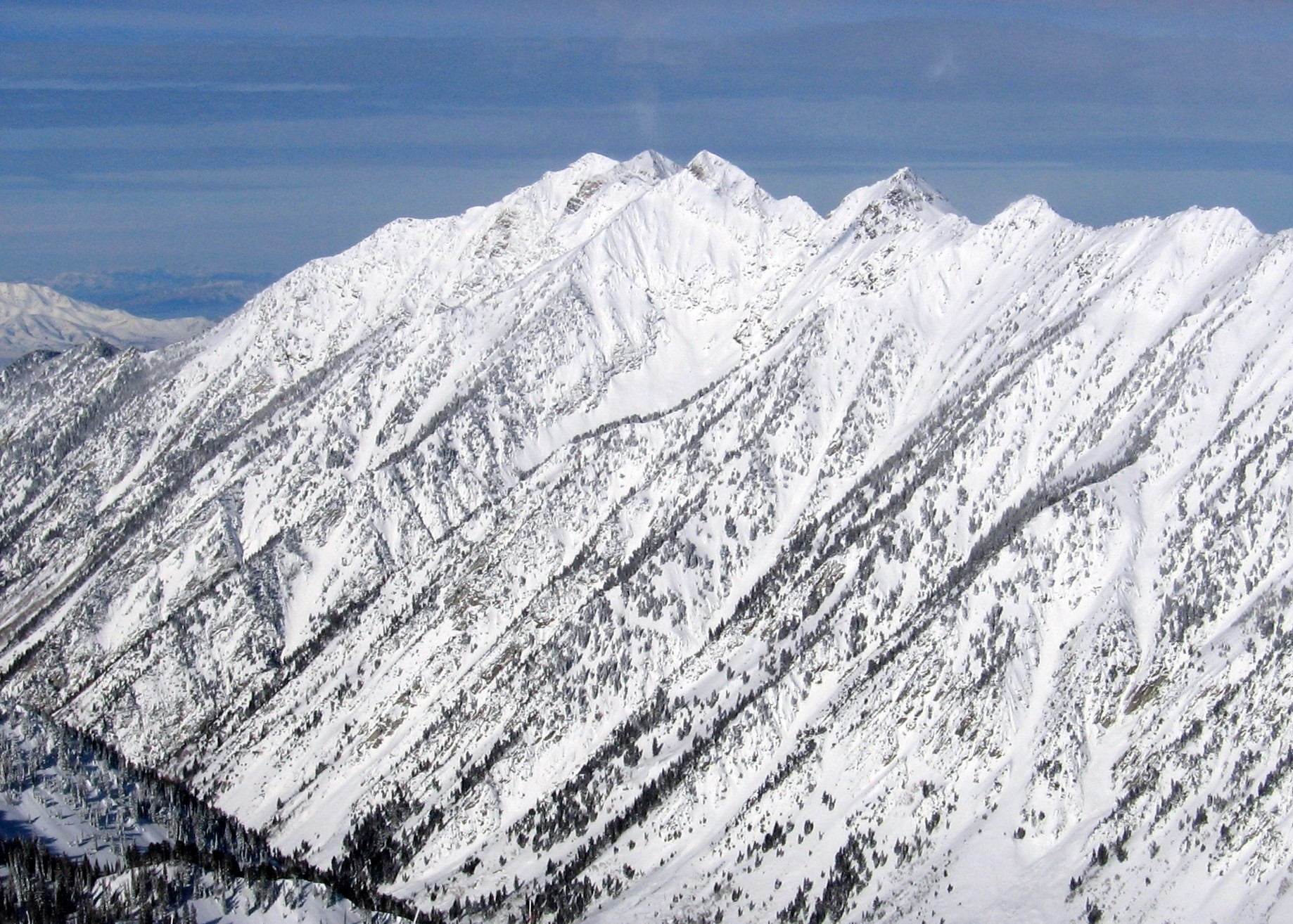
Twin Peaks, O'Sullivan Peak and Dromedary Peak viewed from the southeast from the Snowbird ski area

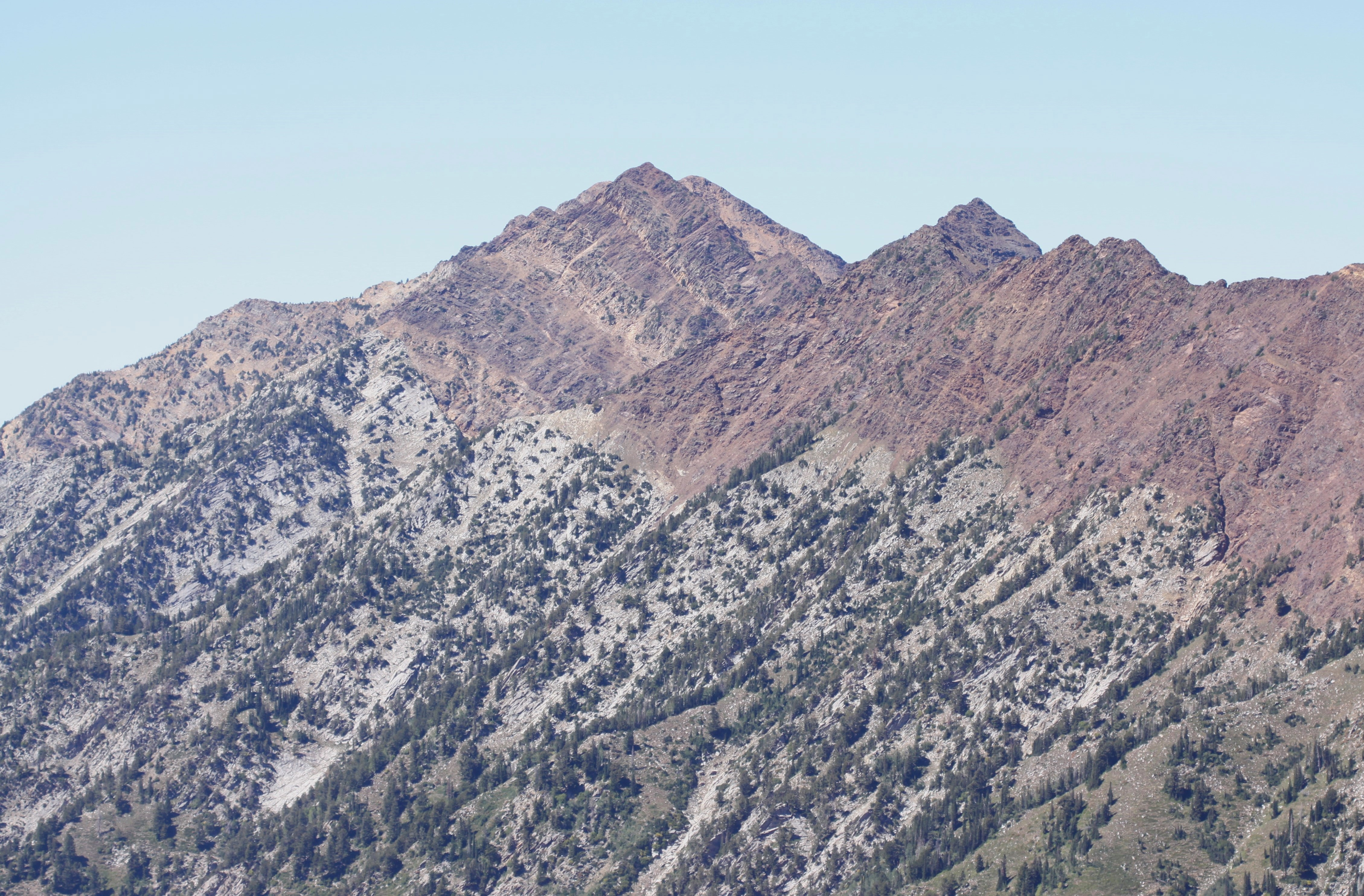
Southeast aspect of O'Sullivan Peak and Dromedary Peak viewed from Germania Pass

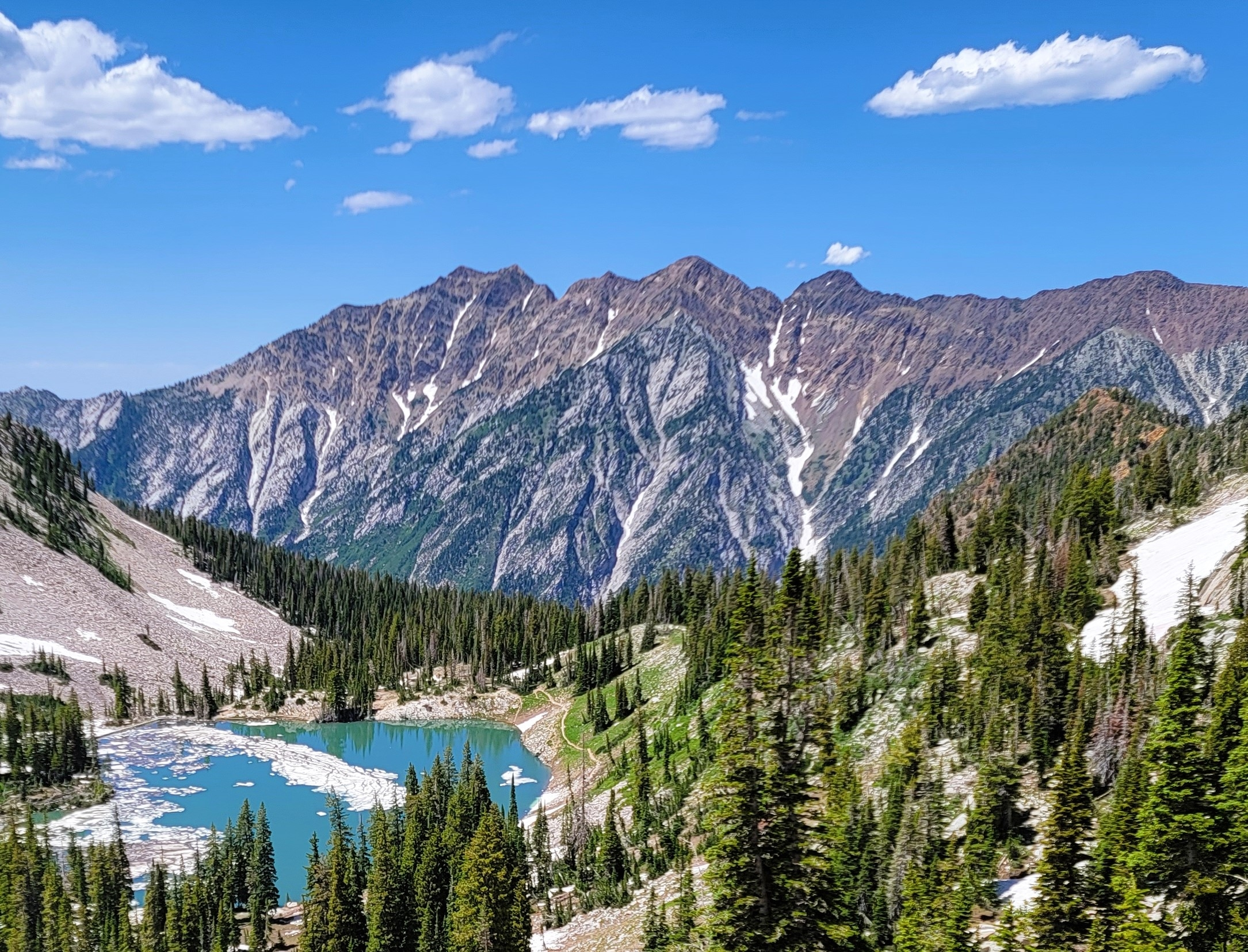
Twin Peaks (left), O'Sullivan Peak (center), Dromedary Peak (right, under cloud), viewed from the south with Red Pine Lake.
