= Sullivan Township =

Sullivan Township may refer to:

== Canada ==
- Sullivan Township, Grey County, Ontario

== United States ==
=== Illinois ===
- Sullivan Township, Livingston County, Illinois
- Sullivan Township, Moultrie County, Illinois

=== Kansas ===
- Sullivan Township, Grant County, Kansas

=== Michigan ===
- Sullivan Township, Michigan

=== Minnesota ===
- Sullivan Township, Polk County, Minnesota

=== North Dakota ===
- Sullivan Township, Ramsey County, North Dakota, in Ramsey County, North Dakota

=== Ohio ===
- Sullivan Township, Ashland County, Ohio

=== Pennsylvania ===
- Sullivan Township, Pennsylvania

== See also ==
- Sullivan (disambiguation)
