= Sullavan =

Sullavan is a surname. Notable people with the surname include:

- Jeri Sullavan, American singer
- Margaret Sullavan (1909–1960), American actress, wife of Henry Fonda, William Wyler, and Leland Hayward

== See also ==
- Sullivan (disambiguation)
