= Judge Sullivan =

Judge Sullivan may refer to:

- Emmet G. Sullivan (born 1947), judge of the United States District Court for the District of Columbia
- Eugene R. Sullivan (born 1941), judge of the United States Court of Appeals for the Armed Forces
- George F. Sullivan (1886–1944), judge of the United States District Court for the District of Minnesota
- Jerry Bartholomew Sullivan (1859–1948), judge of the United States Customs Court
- John Sullivan (general) (1740–1795), judge of the United States District Court for the District of New Hampshire
- Philip Leo Sullivan (1889–1960), judge of the United States District Court for the Northern District of Illinois
- Richard J. Sullivan (born 1964), judge of the United States Court of Appeals for the Second Circuit

== See also ==
- Justice Sullivan (disambiguation)
