= Mount Sulivan =

Mountain on West Falkland

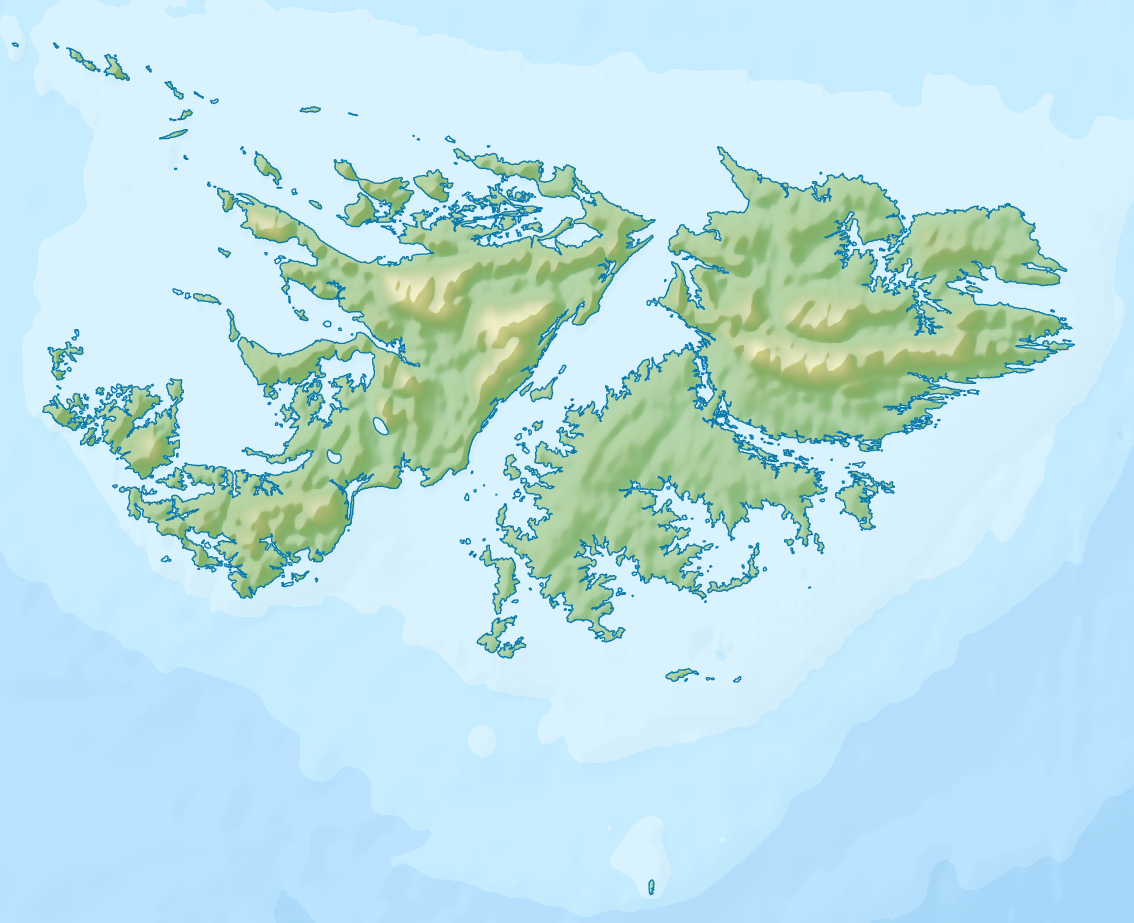
- Location within Falkland Islands

Highest point
- Coordinates: 51.857°S 60.128°W

Geography
- Location: West Falkland, Falkland Islands, south Atlantic Ocean

Mount Sulivan is a mountain on West Falkland, Falkland Islands, not far from Lake Sulivan. It is to the northwest of Fox Bay.
