= Sullivan, Virginia =

Unincorporated community in Virginia, US

Coordinates: 38°18′43″N 77°24′34″W

Sullivan is an unincorporated community in Stafford County, Virginia, United States.
