= Masovian Regional =

Masovian Regional Mazowiecki regionalny
- NUTS2 Region
- Flag

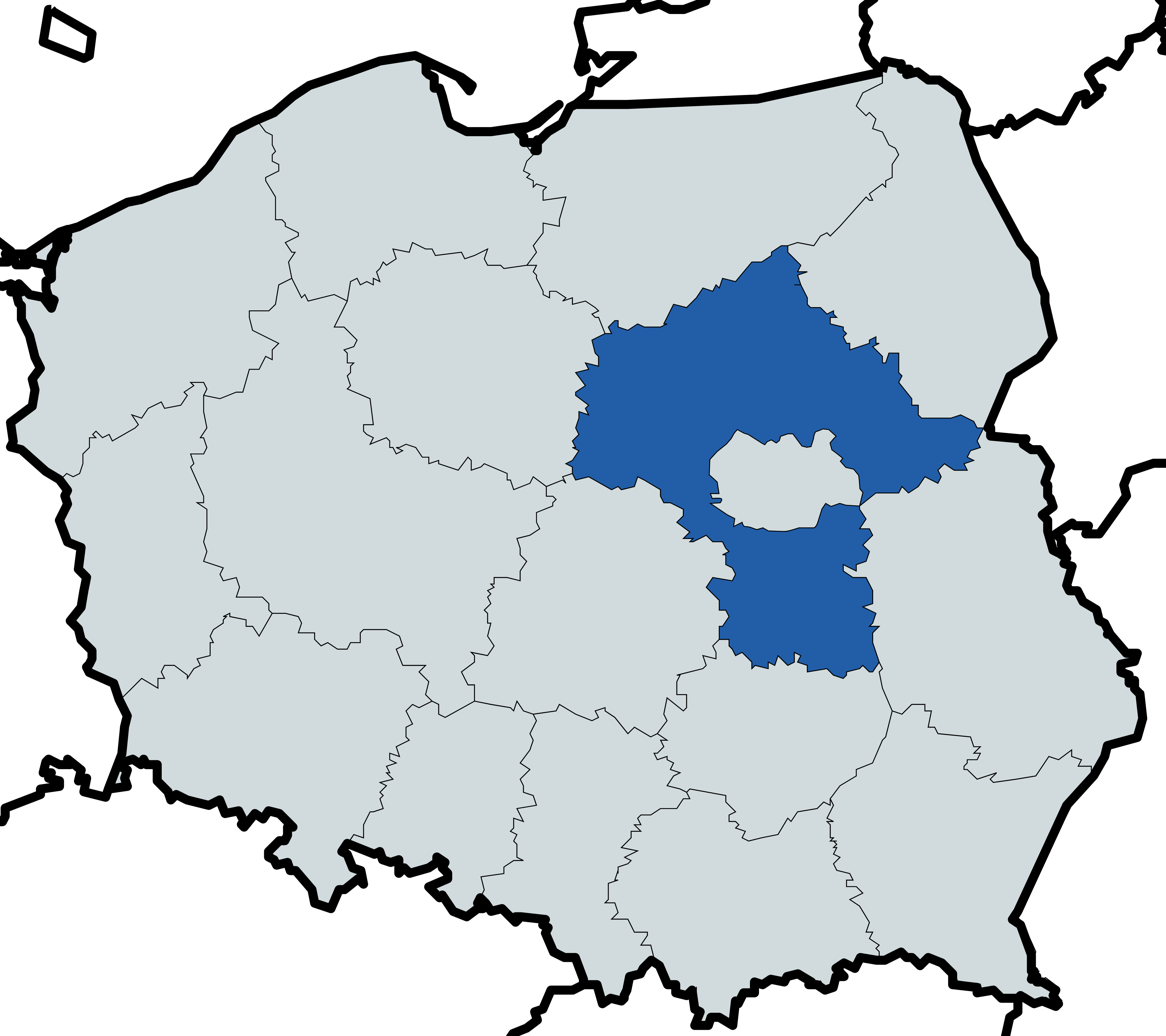
- Masovian Regional in blue
- Country: Poland

Area
  - Total: 29,479 km^{2} (11,382 sq mi)

Population (2022)
  - Total: 2,306,192
  - Density: 78.232/km^{2} (202.62/sq mi)

GDP
  - Total: €40.632 billion (2023)
  - Per capita: €18,300 (2023)

Masovian Regional is statistical area of the Nomenclature of Territorial Units for Statistics, level NUTS 2. It includes all of Masovian Voivodeship excluding Warsaw metropolitan area.

== Economy ==
The Gross domestic product (GDP) of the region was 30.2 billion € in 2021, accounting for only around 5% of Polish economic output. GDP per capita was around €12,900 .
