= Sullivan's Index =

Method to compute life expectancy

Sullivan's index also known as Disability Free Life Expectancy (DFLE) is a method to compute life expectancy free of disability. It is calculated by formula:
Life expectancy $-$ duration of disability
Health expectancy calculated by Sullivan's method is the number of remaining years, at a particular age, that an individual can expect to live in a healthy state. It is computed by subtracting the probable duration of bed disability and inability to perform major activities from the life expectancy. The data for calculation is obtained from population surveys and period life table. The Sullivan's index collects mortality and disability data separately, and this data is almost often readily available. The Sullivan health expectancy reflects the current health of a real population adjusted for mortality levels and independent of age structure.

== See also ==
- Disability-adjusted life year (DALY)
- Quality-adjusted life year (QALY)
- Healthy Life Years
