= Lake Sulivan =

Lake in the Falkland Islands

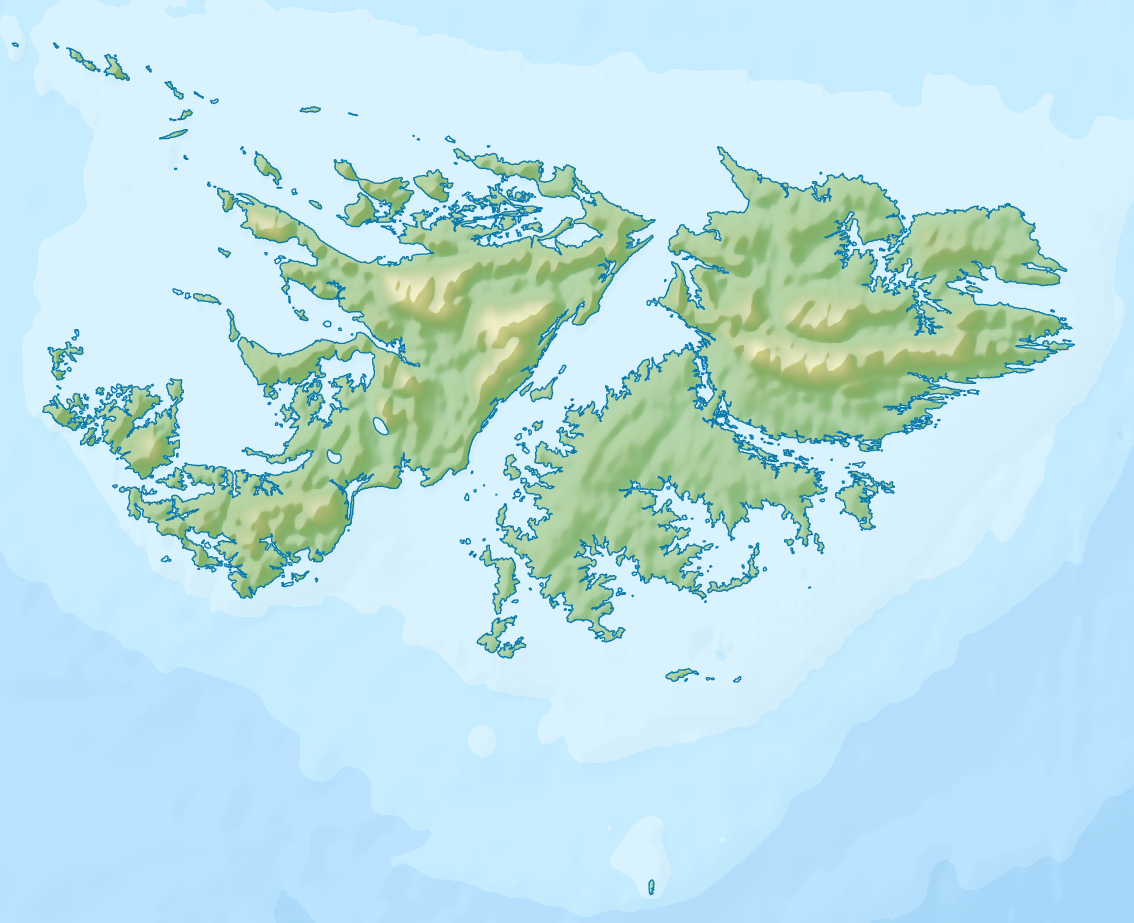
- Location within Falkland Islands
- Location: West Falkland, Falkland Islands
- Coordinates: 51.88°S 60.16°W
- Basin countries: (Falkland Islands)
- Surface area: 16.7 square kilometres (6.4 sq mi)
- Islands: Sand Island

Lake Sulivan (Spanish: Lago Sulivan) is composed of two bodies of water on West Falkland, Falkland Islands, and it is the largest body of fresh water in the Falkland Islands. The Hispanicized version of the lake's name is Lago Sulivan.

== Geography ==
The combined lakes are 9.7 kilometres (6 mi) long and they are actually in two distinct sections separated by a small strip of land only 20 metres (66 ft) across known as Scott Neck.

The hills that rise to the east of the lake are Round Mountain and Long Mountain both around 457 metres (1,499 ft) high, and Mount Sulivan which is 469 metres (1,539 ft). The southern lake also has a small island within its waters called Sand Island, which is no higher than 5 metres (16 ft) and is covered in dunes which show evidence of a higher lake level at some point. The northern lake drains northwards into Port Philomel, and the southern lake drains southwards, principally through the Malo River (Arroyo Malo). (Note: Not to be confused with the Malo River on East Falkland. The Malo River heading south from Lake Sulivan enters the harbour at Port Edgar). Collectively, their surface area is 16.7 square kilometres (6.4 sq mi), with the northern lake being 4.5 square kilometres (1.7 sq mi) and the southern lake covering 12.2 square kilometres (4.7 sq mi).

== History ==
The dividing land known as Scott Neck was named after a fallen British serviceman during the Falklands War. This was a project commissioned in 2022 as part of the 40th anniversary commemorations where over 250 landforms were identified and named after those who had died in the conflict.

== Ecology ==
Due to the peatland nature of most of the Falkland Islands, the freshwater pools and lakes can be quite acidic, but Lake Sulivan has a pH value that is closer to neutral at 6.5 to 7.5. Zebra trout are found in the northern lake, and brown trout in the southern lake. Efforts are being made to keep the fish species apart as the migratory brown trout population on the islands has a negative effect on the zebra trout population.

== Conservation ==
East Bay, Lake Sulivan and the River Doyle, have been proposed as a Ramsar site, and the entire area would cover over 31,900 hectares (79,000 acres).
