= Justice Sullivan =

Justice Sullivan may refer to:

- David Sullivan (judge) (fl. 1990s–2020s), associate justice of the Supreme Court of Mississippi
- Francis W. Sullivan (1894–1967), associate justice of the Maine Supreme Judicial Court
- Frank Sullivan Jr. (born 1950), associate justice of the Indiana Supreme Court
- Isaac N. Sullivan (1848–1938), associate justice of the Idaho Supreme Court
- James Sullivan (governor) (1744–1808), associate justice of the Massachusetts Supreme Judicial Court
- Jeremiah Sullivan (1794–1870), associate justice of the Supreme Court of Indiana
- Jeremiah F. Sullivan (1851–1928), associate justice of the Supreme Court of California
- Jeremy Sullivan (born 1945), Lord Justice of Appeal of England
- John Joseph Sullivan (judge) (1855–1926), chief justice of the Nebraska Supreme Court
- Mark Sullivan (judge) (1911–2001), associate justice of the Supreme Court of New Jersey
- Matt Sullivan (1857–1937), chief justice of the Supreme Court of California
- Michael D. Sullivan (judge) (1938–2000), justice of the Supreme Court of Mississippi
- Raymond L. Sullivan (1907–1999), associate justice of the Supreme Court of California
- William J. Sullivan (born 1939), chief justice of the Connecticut Supreme Court

== See also ==
- Judge Sullivan (disambiguation)
