= Sullivan Township, Livingston County, Illinois =

Coordinates: 40°53′06″N 88°17′28″W

Sullivan Township
- Township
- Location in Livingston County

- Livingston County's location in Illinois
- Country: United States
- State: Illinois
- County: Livingston
- Established: 1863

Area
  - Total: 41.28 sq mi (106.9 km^{2})
  - Land: 41.28 sq mi (106.9 km^{2})
  - Water: 0 sq mi (0 km^{2}) 0%

Population (2020)
  - Total: 657
  - Density: 15.9/sq mi (6.15/km^{2})
- Time zone: UTC-6 (CST)
  - Summer (DST): UTC-5 (CDT)
- FIPS code: 17-105-73482

Sullivan Township is located in Livingston County, Illinois. As of the 2020 census, its population was 657 and it contained 342 housing units. Sullivan Township formed from Saunemin Township in 1863.

== Geography ==
According to the 2021 census gazetteer files, Sullivan Township has a total area of 41.28 square miles (106.91 km^{2}), all land.

The township contains the village of Cullom and the former communities of Griswold, Sullivan Center and Saxony.

== Demographics ==
As of the 2020 census there were 657 people, 262 households, and 194 families residing in the township. The population density was 15.91 inhabitants per square mile (6.14/km^{2}). There were 342 housing units at an average density of 8.28 per square mile (3.20/km^{2}). The racial makeup of the township was 95.13% White, 0.00% African American, 0.15% Native American, 0.00% Asian, 0.00% Pacific Islander, 0.76% from other races, and 3.96% from two or more races. Hispanic or Latino of any race were 2.59% of the population.

There were 262 households, out of which 25.60% had children under the age of 18 living with them, 52.67% were married couples living together, 16.03% had a female householder with no spouse present, and 25.95% were non-families. 19.50% of all households were made up of individuals, and 9.90% had someone living alone who was 65 years of age or older. The average household size was 2.37 and the average family size was 2.65.

According to the 2020 American Community Survey, township's age distribution consisted of 19.3% under the age of 18, 8.2% from 18 to 24, 25.6% from 25 to 44, 26.6% from 45 to 64, and 20.3% who were 65 years of age or older. The median age was 40.1 years. For every 100 females, there were 93.8 males. For every 100 females age 18 and over, there were 91.1 males.

The median income for a household in the township was $50,278, and the median income for a family was $56,500. Males had a median income of $40,714 versus $28,958 for females. The per capita income for the township was $24,823. About 17.5% of families and 18.3% of the population were below the poverty line, including 41.4% of those under age 18 and 4.0% of those age 65 or over.

Historical population
Census	Pop.	Note	%±
2000	738		—
2010	724		−1.9%
2020	657		−9.3%
U.S. Decennial Census
