= Healthy Life Years =

European structural indicator

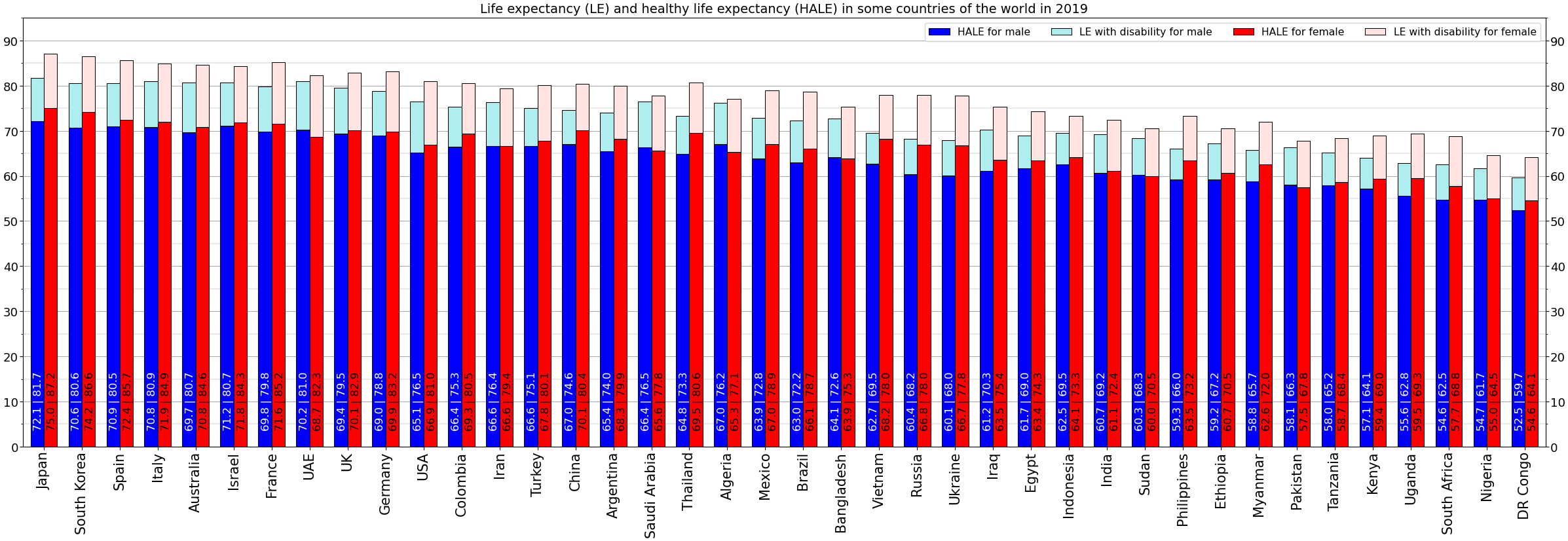
Life expectancy and healthy life expectancy by gender

The Healthy Life Years (HLY) indicator, also known as disability-free life expectancy (DFLE) or Sullivan's Index, is a European structural indicator computed by Eurostat. It is one of the summary measures of population health, known as health expectancies, composite measures of health that combine mortality and morbidity data to represent overall population health on a single indicator. HLY measures the number of remaining years that a person is expected to live at a certain age without the disability.

== History ==
LEB (orange) and HLY (green). WHO 2019 data.

The European Union has decided to include a small set of health expectancies among its European Community Health Indicators (ECHI) to provide synthetic measures of disability, chronic morbidity, and perceived health. Therefore, the Minimum European Health Module (MEHM), composed of 3 general questions covering these dimensions, has been introduced into the Eurostat EU-Statistics on Income and Living Conditions Survey (EU-SILC) to improve the comparability of health expectancies between countries. In addition life expectancy without long term activity limitation, based on the disability question, was selected in 2004 to be one of the structural indicators to be examined every year, during the European Spring Council for assessing the EU strategic goals (Lisbon Strategy) under the name of “Healthy Life Years” (HLY). Furthermore, the European Union is co-funding a Joint Action on Chronic Diseases and Promoting Healthy Ageing across the Life Cycle (CHRODIS-JA). This aims to promote and facilitate a process of exchange and transfer of good practices between European countries and regions, addressing chronic conditions, with a specific focus on health promotion and prevention of chronic conditions, multimorbidity and diabetes.

Detailed information on the Health Expectancies in Europe are available from the EurOhex Advanced research on European health expectancies while latest Healthy Life Years values can be found on the general public website devoted to the Healthy Life Years.

== Context ==
The dramatic increase in the life expectancy in the most developed countries in general and in the countries of the European Union in particular represents one of the most significant achievements of recent decades. The further challenge confronts the European Community:

"increasing life expectancy must be by the increase of its part spent in "good" health".

In this context, the classical mortality indicators are no longer sufficient to monitor the health status of the populations of the European countries. The availability of health expectancy indicators dividing life expectancy into life spent in different states of health is useful to health authorities in the field of public health and health policies provided that these indicators allow comparisons over time, between geographic areas and between socio-economic groups. As the post-war generation reaches the retirement age, the pace of ageing increases dramatically, with the profound societal effects. HLY is an important indicator which is based on the following assumptions:

- Many studies focus on such measures as physical impairment or disability in functional tasks or presence of a specific chronic disease. Self-assessed health, being much more global and subjective in nature, can incorporate a variety of aspects of health including cognitive and emotional as well as physical status, and therefore provide insights into the needs of an ageing society. Therefore, self-assessed health measures as HLY may be a particularly important indicator of the potential demand for health services and long-term care needs.
- The two components of the calculation of the HLY are life tables and self-perceived disability assessed by health surveys. From 1995 to 2001, data from the Eurostat European Community Household Panel (ECHP) survey have been used for the EU-15 Member States. Its successor, the Eurostat EU-SILC has been used from 2005 onwards for the EU-25 and then 27 Member States.
- The analysis of the healthy life years values disclose significant inequalities in between the European countries.

== Productivity behind Healthy Life Years monitoring ==
Healthy life years can also be seen as a productive tool for the econometric analysis, though some scholars claim that one that is based on the self-rated health indicator is better.

The consequences of increasing the number of healthy life years can be advantageous in the economic world. An increase in these years is one of the EU's health policy goals. That is because an increase in the number of healthy life years will not only improve the situation of an individual (in regards to their health and leading a long life during which they are able to do all the fundamental life activities without experiencing any limitations or disability) but would also lead to lower healthcare expenditures (though in a countries with high onset of chronic diseases having disabling influence this might not be the case). It would also increase the possibility that people will be willing to and be able to continue working later.

== Statistical findings ==
In 2015, the number of healthy life years among women in the EU-28 was 63.3.

== Data sources and availability ==
Eurostat calculates information about the healthy life years at birth, at ages 50, and 65. The data is calculated and collected by using mortality statistics as well as self perceived longstanding activity limitations- a dimension that captures longstanding limitation in regards to health and/or disability to perform usual and frequent activities. An example of a question that might be asked concerning the longstanding activity limitation is: "For the last six months, to what extent have you been limited because of a health problem in activities that people usually do?" Some available answers are "severely limited", "limited but not severely", or "not limited at all".

== Limitations of the data ==
The indicators used to calculate healthy life years are self-reported and from that perspective could be distracting. The collected data is influenced by the subjective perception as well as social and cultural background. That is because people from different social backgrounds, race and ethnicity, and socioeconomic status can provide different judgements of their health. Another limitation in regards to the way the data is collected is the consideration of institutionalized people. For example, people living in health and social care institutions, who are expected to be more likely to face limitations than the rest of the population that is living in private households, are not covered or surveyed when collecting the data for healthy life years calculations and expediencies. This therefore impacts the results by limiting it and making it less inclusive.

== Sociological challenges ==
Health status is hard to define and can differ greatly from one person to another. One of the reasons is that it can be influenced by various factors affecting their evaluation of their health. Which is more, being healthy and feeling well can be defined and measured in many different ways. General symptoms mean the assessment of physical and psychological sensations that could usually be determined by a physician or a psychiatrist. Yet, they can only be felt by the patient who will subjectively explain what they feel. These assessments are usually stereotyped to pain and/or feeling of anxiety. These measures are not always observable and their tolerance can vary from one person to another depending on the social background of the person. Therefore, to combine the measures of the different health concepts that people have in their minds into a single number, there is a need to have a conceptual model that would take into consideration that health is a continuum that ranges from perfect health to death.

Another problem is that the average level of health itself (not only the ways of its evaluation) is subject to the influence of different factors and is different in various sub-groups (as mortality does). The examples of such characteristics are: 1) race, and 2) ethnic group. They are the possible independent characteristics influencing as a result also the total amount of healthy life years. Different races and nationalities lead different lifestyles, eat different kinds of food, and live in different environments geographically. All these factors when taken into account could impact the chance of people getting certain diseases or losing their ability to perform a daily life activity. For example, if a certain group of people who pertain to a certain race or ethnic group, where they eat primarily unprocessed food, then these people are less prone to certain diseases and are more likely to live disease free lives for a longer time than people whose diet consists of highly processed food.

Moreover, even people of the same culture and race but of different socioeconomic status could live different number of healthy life years. People of different socioeconomic status are from (or/and can afford) different living conditions associated with initially different levels of spending and the level of development of housing and communal services. For example, consider a poor family that could only afford living in a poor neighborhood where the underground water pipes have very high exposure to lead and where their house lies beside a canal where industries spit their toxic emissions. The members of this family are, according to health science, expected to suffer from health issues earlier in their lives because their lifestyle according to their socioeconomic status forces them to be exposed daily to toxic substances in their environment and to drink water that has high levels of lead. Both of these life circumstance are factors known to cause high blood pressure, kidney failures, etc. With these adverse health effects, these people would have limited ability or in other words are not considered as healthy as members of a family from their same race who live in a wealthy town where their water pipes are tested every now and then.

Overall, many sociological factors need to be considered when calculating the number of healthy life years that people can live. These factors can include but are not limited to: race, ethnicity, household upbringing, and socioeconomic status.

== See also ==
- Disability-adjusted life year
- Quality-adjusted life year
- Sullivan's Index
- Life expectancy
