= Twin Peaks Wilderness =

Wilderness area in Utah, United States

- IUCN category Ib (wilderness area)
- Location within the United States
- Location: Salt Lake County, Utah; United States
- Nearest city: Sandy
- Coordinates: 40.600950°N 111.719990°W
- Area: 11,396 acres (46.1 km^{2})
- Established: 1984
- Governing body: U.S. Forest Service

Twin Peaks Wilderness is a 11,396 acres (46.12 km^{2}) wilderness area in the Wasatch Range of Uinta-Wasatch-Cache National Forest in Salt Lake County, Utah, United States. The Mount Olympus Wilderness is directly north of the Twin Peaks Wilderness and separated by Utah State Route 190. The Lone Peak Wilderness is directly to the south and separated by Utah State Route 210. Elevations in the wilderness range from under 5,000 feet (1,500 m) to 11,330 feet (3,450 m) on Twin Peaks.

== See also ==
- List of U.S. Wilderness Areas
- Wilderness Act
