= Sullivan (surname) =

Sullivan is a surname of Irish origin. An approximate 78 percent of Sullivans are located in the United States as it is the 105th most common surname according to the 2010 US census.

== History ==
The name is an anglicised form of O'Sullivan (Ó Súilleabháin). Due to immigration out of Ireland, it is most common in North America, and also found in Australia, as well as Britain.

== People with surname ==
=== A ===
- Alexander Martin Sullivan, Irish politician
- Alice Sullivan, British sociologist
- Andi Sullivan, American soccer player
- Andrew Sullivan, conservative author and political commentator
- Ann Sullivan (animator) (1929–2020), American animator
- Anne Sullivan, teacher and mentor to Helen Keller
- Anton Sullivan (born 1991/1992), Offaly Gaelic footballer
- Arthur Sullivan, the composer, best known for his work as part of Gilbert and Sullivan
- Ashlee Sullivan, American artistic gymnast

=== B ===
- Barry F. Sullivan (1930–2016), American financier
- Barry Sullivan (American actor) (1912–1994), American actor
- Becky Sullivan, sound editor
- Billy Sullivan (1891–1946), American character actor
- Brian Sullivan, various people
- Brittany McKey Sullivan, winner of America's Next Top Model, Cycle 11

=== C ===
- Cavan Sullivan (born 2009), American soccer player; younger brother of Quinn (nelow)
- Chandon Sullivan (born 1996), American football player
- Charles L. Sullivan, American politician
- Charles P. Sullivan, American lawyer and politician
- Charles Sullivan, American character actor
- Charles Thompson Sullivan (1884–1948), Canadian mathematician
- Christopher D. Sullivan, US Representative from New York from 1917 to 1941
- Chub Sullivan, Major League Baseball first baseman
- Cole Sullivan (born 2005), American football player
- Con Sullivan, New Zealand-Australian rugby league footballer
- Cory Sullivan, Major League Baseball outfielder

=== D ===
- Dan Sullivan (Mayor of Anchorage) (born 1951), mayor of Anchorage, Alaska
- Dan Sullivan (U.S. senator) (born 1964), United States Senator from Alaska
- Daniel Sullivan (disambiguation), several people
- Danny Sullivan (technologist) (born 1965), expert in search engine optimization
- Danny Sullivan, race car driver and former winner of the Indianapolis 500
- Dean Sullivan (1955–2023), English actor
- Dennis Michael Sullivan, American engineer
- Dennis Sullivan, American mathematician
- Denny Sullivan (third baseman), American baseball player
- Denny Sullivan, American baseball player

=== E ===
- Eamon Sullivan, Australian Olympic swimmer
- Ed Sullivan, American entertainment writer who hosted a CBS-TV variety show, The Ed Sullivan Show.
- Edmund Joseph Sullivan (1869–1933), British book illustrator
- Eleanore Sullivan
- Elijah Sullivan (born 1997), American football player
- Elizabeth Higgins Sullivan (1872–1953), American writer
- Erik Per Sullivan, American actor, most known as Dewey on Malcolm in the Middle
- Sir Edward Sullivan, 1st Baronet

=== F ===
- Fleury F. Sullivan (1870–1951), American politician
- Fleury Sullivan (1862–1897), American baseball player
- Frances T. Sullivan, New York state assemblywoman 1991–2002
- Francis L. Sullivan (1903–1956), Tony Award-winning Anglo-American actor
- Francis Stoughton Sullivan (1715–1766), Irish lawyer and Irish culture enthusiast.

=== G ===
- Gordon R. Sullivan (1937–2024), American general
- Grant Sullivan (1924–2011), American actor

=== H ===
- Harry Stack Sullivan, American psychologist and psychoanalyst
- Harry Sullivan (baseball) (1818–1919), Major League Baseball pitcher

=== J ===
- J. W. N. Sullivan, journalist and writer of popular science
- Jake Sullivan, American lawyer and politician
- James Sullivan, various people
- Jeremiah C. Sullivan, American Civil War general in the Union Army
- Jim Sullivan, various people
- Jimmy "The Rev" Sullivan (1981–2009), American musician, composer and songwriter of California metal band Avenged Sevenfold
- John L. Sullivan, American prize-fighter
- John Sullivan (British governor) (1788–1855)
- John Sullivan, British writer
- John Sullivan, general in the American Revolution and Governor of New Hampshire
- Jonathan Sullivan, China specialist and political scientist.
- Joseph Sullivan, various people
- Justin Sullivan, frontman and lyricist of the British rock band New Model Army

=== K ===
- Kate Sullivan, Chicago news anchor
- Kathryn D. Sullivan, first American woman astronaut to walk in space
- Kevin J. Sullivan (mayor), mayor of Lawrence, Massachusetts
- Kevin Sullivan (wrestler), American pro wrestler
- Kyle Sullivan, American actor

=== L ===
- Larry Sullivan (born 1970), American actor
- Larry Sullivan (born c. 1952), American soccer coach; grandfather of Cavan and Quinn
- Lauren Sullivan, British politician
- Liam Kyle Sullivan (born 1973), American comedian/actor
- Lillie Sullivan (1855–1903), American scientific illustrator
- Lily Sullivan, Australian actress
- Lou Sullivan (1951—1991), American transgender activist and historian
- Louis Sullivan (1856–1924), American architect

=== M ===
- Margaret Frances Sullivan (1848–1903), Irish-American writer, journalist, editor
- Mark Sullivan, American podcaster and founder of Snowboard Magazine
- Mark T. Sullivan, American author
- Maud Durlin Sullivan (1870–1943), American librarian
- Maurice Sullivan (disambiguation)
- Maxine Sullivan (1911–1987), American jazz singer
- Mecca Jamilah Sullivan, American author and professor
- Michael Sullivan (disambiguation)
- Mick Sullivan, English rugby league footballer
- Mike Sullivan (Canadian politician), Canadian Member of Parliament
- Mike Sullivan (ice hockey) American Hockey Coach
- Mike Sullivan (governor)
- Morris Sullivan, businessman and co-founder of Sullivan Bluth Studios, an animation studio

=== N ===
- Nancy Sullivan (disambiguation), multiple people
- Nicole Sullivan, American actress, voice actress, comedian
- Niki Sullivan (1937–2004), American rock and roll guitarist

=== P ===
- Pat Sullivan (1950–2019), American football quarterback and winner of the 1971 Heisman Trophy
- Patrick J. Sullivan (Pennsylvania politician), Pennsylvania congressman
- Patrick Joseph Sullivan, Wyoming senator
- Patrick Sullivan (American football executive)
- Peter Sullivan, British man wrongfully convicted of murder

=== Q ===
- Quinn Sullivan (born 2004), American soccer player; older brother of Cavan (above)

=== R ===
- Robert Baldwin Sullivan, Canadian lawyer, judge, and politician who became the second mayor of Toronto
- Rosemary Sullivan, Canadian writer (1947- )
- Roy Sullivan, American park ranger

=== S ===
- Sam Sullivan, mayor of Vancouver, British Columbia
- Sasha "Magi" Sullivan, American professional video game player
- Sawyer Sullivan, American archer
- Stephanie S. Sullivan, United States Ambassador to the Republic of the Congo
- Stephen Sullivan (disambiguation), multiple people
- Steve Sullivan, North American NHL hockey player
- Susan Sullivan, various people

=== T ===
- Teresa A. Sullivan (born 1949), American sociologist, president of University of Virginia
- Tim or Timothy Sullivan, various people

=== W ===
- William H. Sullivan, US Ambassador

== See also ==
- O'Sullivan (surname)
- O'Sullivan family
