= O'Sullivan (surname) =

O'Sullivan is a surname of Irish origin. The surname is associated with the southwestern part of Ireland, and was originally found in County Tipperary and Kerry before the Anglo-Norman invasion. It is the third most numerous surname in Ireland. Roughly half of O'Sullivans hail from Ireland, with around 50% of the O'Sullivans residing there.

== History ==
Ó Súilleabháin consists of ó (Old Irish úa) "grandchild, descendant", and the masculine genitive case of Súileabhán, viz. Súileabhán's grandchild/descendant. The female form in Modern Irish is Ní Shúileabhán; "ní" is the shortened form of iníon uí, iníon "daughter", uí, the genitive of ó "grandchild, descendant".

The etymology of the given name is uncertain. In his book titled The Surnames of Ireland, genealogist Edward MacLysaght states that “while there is no doubt that the basic word is súil (eye) there is a disagreement as to the meaning of the last part of the name.” It is interpreted as súildubhán ⇄ “little dark-eyed one” by Woulfe in Sloinnte Gaedheal is Gall, from súil ⇄ "eye," dubh ⇄ "dark/black," and combined with the diminutive suffix -án. Other suggested etymologies include "one-eyed" and "hawk-eyed."

The original bearer of the name, one Suilebhan mac Maolura, is recorded in legendary Irish genealogy as belonging to the 8th generation after Fíngen mac Áedo Duib, and placed in the 9th century.

MacLysaght lists Mac Criomhthain (MacCrohan) and Mac Giolla Chuda (MacGillycuddy) as notable branches of the Súileabhánaigh in County Kerry.

O'Sullivan is the regular anglicization of the Irish name. Less common spelling variants of the name include: Sullavan, Sullivant, Sillivant, Silliphant, and Sillifant.

Some O'Sullivans in the midlands and south Ulster were originally (O) Sullahan (from Ó Súileacháin, probably from súileach, quick-eyed, according to MacLysaght). This surname has now almost entirely changed to Sullivan.

== Modern events ==
On May 30, 2026, a gathering of 1,848 people with the surnames O'Sullivan and Sullivan in Castletownbere, County Cork, was certified by Guinness World Records as the largest recorded gathering of people sharing a surname. The previous record was held by the Gallagher name, set on 9 September 2007 in Letterkenny, County Donegal, Ireland, with 1,488 participants.

== People with surname ==
=== A ===
- Aisling Clíodhnadh O'Sullivan (born 1984), Irish comedian, actress, and screenwriter
- Andy O'Sullivan (Irish republican), Irish republican hunger striker

=== C ===
- Camille O'Sullivan (born 1975), Irish singer
- Cormac O'Sullivan, fictional character
- Cornelius O'Sullivan (1841–1907), Irish brewer's chemist

=== D ===
- Daniel O'Sullivan (disambiguation), several people
- David O'Sullivan (disambiguation), several people
- Denis O'Sullivan (golfer) (born 1948), Irish golfer
- Denis J. O'Sullivan (1918–1987), Irish Fine Gael TD from Cork
- Denise O'Sullivan (born 1994), Irish footballer
- Derry O'Sullivan (1944–2025), Irish-language poet
- Diarmuid O'Sullivan (born 1978), Irish sportsman
- Donal O'Sullivan (disambiguation), several people
- Donal Cam O'Sullivan Beare (1561–1613), Irish chieftain
- Donie O'Sullivan (journalist) (born 1991)

=== E ===
- Eddie O'Sullivan (born 1958), Irish rugby union coach and footballer
- Edward William O'Sullivan (1846–1910), Australian journalist and politician
- Eoghan Rua Ó Súilleabháin (Owen Roe O'Sullivan, 1748–1782), Irish Gaelic poet
- Eugene D. O'Sullivan (1883–1968), American Democratic Party politician from Nebraska

=== G ===
- Gearóid O'Sullivan (1891–1948), Irish teacher, Irish Republican Army officer, barrister and Sinn Féin and Fine Gael politician
- Gerald Robert O'Sullivan VC (1888–1915), Irish soldier in the British Army, recipient of the Victoria Cross
- Gerry O'Sullivan (1936–1994), Irish Labour Party TD
- Gilbert O'Sullivan (born 1946), Irish-born, UK-based singer-songwriter, who had several hits in the 1970s
- Gillian O'Sullivan (born 1976), Irish race walker
- Grace O'Sullivan (born 1962), Irish environmentalist and politician
- Graham O'Sullivan, Kerry Gaelic footballer

=== H ===
- Harry Sullivan (baseball) (1888–1919), Major League Baseball pitcher
- Harry Stack Sullivan, American psychologist and psychoanalyst

=== J ===
- J. T. O'Sullivan (born 1979), American professional football player
- Jacquie O'Sullivan (born 1960), British singer and songwriter
- Jan O'Sullivan (born 1950), Irish Labour Party politician, currently a Teachta Dála (TD) for Limerick East
- Jeremiah O'Sullivan (1842–1896), Irish-born American Roman Catholic bishop
- Jerry O'Sullivan (disambiguation), several people
- John O'Sullivan (disambiguation), several people
- Sir John O'Sullivan (c. 1700 – c. 1760), a professional soldier in the service of France, known for his involvement in the Jacobite rising of 1745.
- Julie O'Sullivan (born 1959), American lawyer and academic

=== K ===
- Katriona O'Sullivan British writer and psychologist
- Kevin O'Sullivan (baseball) (born 1968), American college baseball coach
- Kevin O'Sullivan (born 1980),Welsh shop worker

=== L ===
- Laura O'Sullivan (born 1991), Welsh footballer
- Louise O'Sullivan (born 1973), Irish telecommunications executive
- Lance O'Sullivan (born 1963), New Zealand jockey, retired

=== M ===
- Maggie O'Sullivan (born 1951), British poet, performer and visual artist
- Marcus O'Sullivan (born 1961), Irish coach and former middle-distance runner based in the United States
- Mary Blanche O'Sullivan (1860 – ?), American teacher, writer and editor
- Maureen O'Sullivan (1911–1998), Irish cinema actress
- Maurice O'Sullivan (disambiguation), several people
- Michael O'Sullivan (disambiguation), several people
- Michael J. Sullivan (born 1961), author
- Mícheál Ó Súilleabháin (1950–2018), Irish composer and musician
- Mickey O'Sullivan (1932–2012), American college baseball coach
- Muiris Ó Súilleabháin (1904–1950), Irish writer; author of autobiography Fiche Blian ag Fás (Twenty Years A-Growing), a description of life on the Great Blasket Island.

=== N ===
- Nóirín O'Sullivan, first female Commissioner of the Garda Síochána

=== P ===
- Paddy O'Sullivan (1918–1994), female Special Operations Executive spy during World War II
- Pádraig O'Sullivan, Irish Fianna Fáil politician
- Pat O'Sullivan, American amateur golfer who won the 1951 Titleholders Championship
- Patrick O'Sullivan (born 1985), Canadian-born American professional ice hockey player
- Patrick O'Sullivan (disambiguation), several people
- Paul O'Sullivan Band (formed in 2014), Pop-Rock band where all four members are named Paul O'Sullivan.
- Peter O'Sullivan (disambiguation), several people

=== R ===
- Richard O'Sullivan (1944–2026), English actor, notable for his sitcom roles in the 1970s and 1980s
- Ronnie O'Sullivan (born 1975), English professional snooker player

=== S ===
- Sean O'Sullivan (disambiguation), several people
- Seumas O'Sullivan (1879–1958), Irish poet and editor of The Dublin Magazine
- Shawn O'Sullivan (born 1964), Canadian boxer
- Siobhan O'Sullivan (1974–2023), Australian political scientist and political theorist
- Sonia O'Sullivan (born 1969), Irish Olympic runner, Sophie's mother
- Sophie O'Sullivan (born 2001) Irish Australian runner, Sonia's daughter
- Stephanie O'Sullivan (born 1959), Principal Deputy Director of National Intelligence (USA)

=== T ===
- Terence Patrick O'Sullivan (1913–1970), English civil engineer
- Thomas C. O'Sullivan (c. 1858–1913), New York politician and judge
- Timothy O'Sullivan (Fianna Fáil politician) (1899–1969), Irish Fianna Fáil Party politician
- Timothy H. O'Sullivan (c. 1840–1882), American Civil War photographer
- Toddy O'Sullivan (1934–2021), Irish Labour Party politician
- Tyrone O'Sullivan (1945–2023), Socialist and Chairman of Goitre Tower Anthracite Ltd., the owners of Tower Colliery.

=== V ===
- Vince O'Sullivan (born 1957), American racewalker
- Vincent O'Sullivan (American writer) (1868–1940), Decadent American writer
- Vincent O'Sullivan (New Zealand writer) (1937–2024), New Zealand poet

=== W ===
- Wayne O'Sullivan (born 1974), Irish soccer player in Australia
- William S. O'Sullivan (1928–1971), Irish-American gangster

== See also ==
- O'Sullivan, Ancestral Irish family
- O'Sullivan family
- Sullivan (surname)
