= Gerald O'Sullivan =

Gerald O'Sullivan may refer to:

- Gerald O'Sullivan (judge) (1891–1960), Australian judge, acting Judge on the New South Wales Supreme Court
- Gerald Robert O'Sullivan (1888–1915), Irish soldier in the British Army and recipient of the Victoria Cross
- Gearóid O'Sullivan (1891–1948), Irish teacher, army officer, barrister and Sinn Féin and Fine Gael politician.

== See also ==
- Gerry O'Sullivan, Irish politician
- Gerry O'Sullivan (media)
- Jerry O'Sullivan (disambiguation)
