= James Sullivan =

James, Jim or Jimmy Sullivan may refer to:

== Entertainment ==
- James Sullivan (1981–2009), or The Rev, Avenged Sevenfold drummer
- Jim Sullivan (musician) (1939–1975?), American singer-songwriter who disappeared in New Mexico
- Big Jim Sullivan (1941–2012), English guitarist
- Jim Sullivan (writer) (born 1978), English comedy writer
- Jim Sullivan, sculptor of the Babe Ruth Home Run Award

== Politics ==
- James Sullivan (governor) (1744–1808), governor of Massachusetts, 1807–08
- James Mark Sullivan (1873–1935), American lawyer and diplomat
- James Sullivan (city manager) (1925–2012), American city manager
- Jim Sullivan (Wisconsin politician) (born 1967), state senator for Wisconsin's 5th Senate district
- Jim Sullivan (Irish republican) (c. 1932–1992), member of the Official IRA in Belfast at time of outbreak of Northern Ireland troubles
- Jimmy Sullivan (Queensland politician) (1982–2026), Australian politician in Queensland
- James Sullivan (Victorian politician) (1817–1876), Australian politician in Victoria
- James P. Sullivan (judge) (born 1981), Texas Supreme Court Justice (2025–present)

== Sports ==
- James Edward Sullivan (1862–1914), American Olympic official
- James Sullivan (athlete) (1885–1965), American Olympic athlete in 1906 and 1908
- Jim Sullivan (boxer) (1886–1949), British boxer
- Jimmy Sullivan (footballer) (1896–1983), Victorian Football League player
- Jim Sullivan (rugby, born 1903) (1903–1977), Welsh rugby league player
- Jim Sullivan (Australian footballer) (born 1942), former Australian rules footballer
- Jim Sullivan (Australian rugby league) (fl. 1950s), Australian rugby league player
- Jim Sullivan (English footballer) (1904–1974), English association footballer
- Jim Sullivan (1920s pitcher) (1894–1972), Major League baseball pitcher, 1921–1923
- Jim Sullivan (1890s pitcher) (1867–1901), Major League baseball pitcher, 1891–1898
- Jim Sullivan (curler) (1968–2011), Canadian curler

== Other ==
- James Sullivan (soldier) (1828–1918), American soldier and Medal of Honor recipient
- James F. Sullivan (1857–1917), American sailor and Medal of Honor recipient
- James W. Sullivan (1909–1974), American art director
- James Stephen Sullivan (1929–2006), American prelate of the Roman Catholic Church
- L. James Sullivan (1933–2024), American firearms inventor
- James J. Sullivan, American lawyer specializing in occupational safety and health law
- James P. Sullivan, fictional protagonist of the Monsters Inc. franchise
