= Patricia Sullivan =

Patricia Sullivan may refer to:

- Patricia A. Sullivan (chancellor), former chancellor of the University of North Carolina at Greensboro
- Patricia A. Sullivan, lawyer who assisted captives held in extrajudicial detention at Guantanamo -- Guantanamo Bay attorneys
- Patty Sullivan (born 1968), Canadian actress and television host
- Patricia Sullivan (politician), former congressional candidate and leader of the Tea Party movement in Florida

== See also ==
- Patricia O'Sullivan, World War II spy
- Patrick Sullivan (disambiguation)
