= Ross McGillycuddy =

Irish politician (1882–1950)

Senator
- In office 27 April 1938 – 8 September 1943
- Constituency: Agricultural Panel

Senator
- In office 9 December 1931 – 29 May 1936

Personal details
- Born: 26 October 1882 County Kerry, Ireland
- Died: 26 April 1950 (aged 67) County Kerry, Ireland
- Party: Independent
- Spouse: Helen Courage (m. 1908)
- Children: 4
- Education: Fettes College; Royal Military Academy, Woolwich

Military service
- Allegiance: United Kingdom
- Branch/service: British Army
- Years of service: 1902–1919
- Rank: Lieutenant Colonel
- Unit: 4th Royal Irish Dragoon Guards; Machine Gun Corps
- Battles/wars: World War I
- Awards: Distinguished Service Order; Legion of Honour; Mentioned in dispatches (4)

Ross Kinlough McGillycuddy (styled The McGillycuddy of the Reeks; 26 October 1882 – 26 April 1950) was an Irish politician.

He was educated at Fettes College and Royal Military Academy, Woolwich, joined the Royal Field Artillery, and was posted to India in 1903. He married Helen Courage of Shenfield Place, Essex in 1908; they had four children. He was a lieutenant colonel in the 4th Royal Irish Dragoon Guards, and witnessed the first action in World War I in August 1914 at Casteau. He was mentioned in dispatches four times; and awarded a Distinguished Service Order and Legion of Honour for improving the mobility of the Vickers machine gun. Brigadier Beauvoir De Lisle ordered him to form the first 36 companies of the Machine Gun Corps.

He retired to Ireland on his father's death in 1921 and became a Kerry County Councillor in 1926. He was an independent member of Seanad Éireann from 1928 to 1936, and 1938 to 1943. He was elected at the 1928 Seanad election for three years, and re-elected at the 1931 Seanad election for nine years. He served until the Free State Seanad was abolished in 1936. He was elected to the 2nd Seanad in 1938 on the Agricultural Panel and was re-elected to the 3rd Seanad.

During World War II he was at the same time a senator, an officer in the British Army and Chief of the Name. After McGillycuddy complained to the BBC, its 1949 Green Book of standards entered the stricture 'Do not mention the McGillycuddy of the Reeks or make jokes about his name'.
