= Lahaina Gateway =

Shopping mall in Maui, Hawaii, U.S.

- Foodland Farms storefront at Lahaina Gateway
- Location: Lahaina, Hawaii, United States
- Coordinates: 20.8866°N 156.6823°W
- Address: 305 Keawe Street
- Opened: April 2008
- Developer: Western Partitions, Inc.; Kiewit Construction
- Manager: The Festival Companies
- Owner: Strategic Retail Trust
- Num. of stores: 41
- Num. of anchor tenants: 1
- Floor area: 137,000 square feet (13,000 m^{2})
- Floors: 2
- Website: lahainagateway.com

Lahaina Gateway is a shopping mall located in Lahaina, Hawaii. The mall was completed in April 2008 and covers approximately 137,000 square feet (13,000 m^{2}) of retail space on two floors. It has been managed and owned by various companies, and the mall itself has been in foreclosure on two occasions. Some of the current tenants at the center include Ross, Lahaina's Department of Motor Vehicles offices, and a Foodland Farms grocery store. Lahaina Gateway was inspired by traditional Hawaiian architecture, with some of the buildings' facades featuring stucco accents.

== Background ==
Lahaina Gateway opened in April 2008, becoming the largest shopping center in western Maui. The mall was developed by Bilarjo LLC with Kiewit Construction serving as its contractor. It took approximately 13 months to construct the 136,683 square feet (13,000 m^{2}) of retail space across 11 acres, TNP Strategic Trust acquired the center, which had gone into foreclosure, in 2011 for approximately US$32 million. However, TNP Chief Executive Anthony Thompson remarked that despite news of foreclosure, the center was receiving strong leasing inquiries. The company bought the mall after selling its other property, Oahu's Waianae Mall, for US$25.7 million. In November 2012, the center went into foreclosure again and was purchased by Strategic Retail Trust from TNP's backers, the Central Pacific Bank. Lahaina Gateway is currently managed by The Festival Companies, according to their official website.

=== Events ===
Maui Gift and Craft Fair every Sunday 9–2. Several limited events and fundraisers have occurred at the shopping center since its construction. Annually, during the month of October, Lahaina Gateway hosts various events as part of their Pineapples & Pumpkins Halloween festival. The mall also hosted a classic car show that took place in March 2015. In addition, the annual Wiki Wiki Run takes place near the shopping center.

== Design and tenants ==
The shopping center is designed in the image of traditional Hawaiian towns. It consists of various buildings, some of which have a "plantation style" appearance while others are more influenced by modern architecture. Furthermore, some of the structures contain stucco on their exteriors. Lahaina Gateway is anchored by a Foodland Farms grocery store that sells organic and Maui-grown foods and drinks. Other tenants at the shopping mall include women's retailer Passion 4 Fashion Boutique, the largest Barnes & Noble location in Hawaii, and Lahaina's official Department of Motor Vehicles offices. Cultural center Na Lio Maui was open at the center for a limited run in 2015. Its purpose was to inform tourists and visitors about the history of horses in Hawaiian culture. The Melting Pot, a fondue restaurant, closed at Lahaina Gateway on February 24, 2013, leaving approximately 30 workers unemployed.
