= Jerry O'Sullivan =

Jerry O'Sullivan may refer to:

- Jerry O'Sullivan (GAA) (born 1951), Gaelic games administrator
- Jerry O'Sullivan (hurler) (1940–1985), Irish hurler and Gaelic footballer
- Jerry O'Sullivan (musician), Irish-American musician

== See also ==
- Gerry O'Sullivan (1936–1994), Irish politician
- Gerry O'Sullivan (media) (born 1964), television executive
- Gerald O'Sullivan (disambiguation)
