= O'Sullivan Beare =

O'Sullivan Beare, a surname used by a branch of the O'Sullivan family in Ireland, may refer to:

- Donal Cam O'Sullivan Beare (1560 – 1618)
- Philip O'Sullivan Beare (c.1590 – 1636)
