= Joseph Sullivan =

Joseph Sullivan may refer to:

- Joseph Sullivan (cricketer) (1890–1932), Yorkshire cricketer
- Joseph Sullivan (FBI agent) (1917–2002), FBI major case investigator who led the investigation of the murders of three civil rights workers in 1964
- Joseph Sullivan (mayor) (born 1959), mayor of Braintree, Massachusetts
- Joseph Sullivan (British politician) (1866–1935), Scottish Member of Parliament for North Lanarkshire and Bothwell
- Joseph Sullivan (rower) (born 1987), New Zealand rower
- Joseph Sullivan (diplomat) (born 1944), American ambassador
- Joseph A. Sullivan (1911–2002), Pennsylvania politician
- Joseph Albert Sullivan (1901–1988), Canadian ice hockey player
- Joseph Eugene Sullivan (1918–1942), American sailor, one of the five Sullivan brothers killed in World War II
- Joseph J. Sullivan (1870–1949), professional gambler and instigator of the 1919 Black Sox scandal
- Joseph J. Sullivan (vaudeville), blackface comedian and acrobat in New York
- Joseph Michael Sullivan (1930–2013), American prelate of the Roman Catholic Church
- Joseph Vincent Sullivan (1919–1982), American prelate of the Roman Catholic Church
- Joseph Sullivan (baseball)
- Joseph Sullivan (Heroes), a fictional character in the TV series Heroes
- Joseph Sullivan (runner) (born 1917), 3rd in the 10,000 m at the 1939 USA Outdoor Track and Field Championships
- Joseph Sullivan (entrepreneur), founder and owner of Daxbot

== See also ==
- Joe Sullivan (disambiguation)
