= Times Supermarkets =

American supermarket chain

- Company type: Subsidiary
- Industry: Retail
- Founded: 1949; 77 years ago
- Headquarters: Honolulu, Hawaii
- Number of locations: 24 (2020)
- Products: Bakery, dairy, deli, frozen foods, general grocery, meat, pharmacy, produce, seafood, snacks, liquor
- Parent: Pan Pacific International Holdings Corporation
- Website: www.timessupermarkets.com

Times Supermarkets (full name Times Supermarkets, Ltd.) is an American supermarket chain headquartered in Honolulu, Hawaii. Times operates 24 stores throughout the state of Hawaiʻi, 17 using the Times name, five operating under the Big Save brand (all on Kauaʻi), one specialty food/liquor store under the Fujioka's Wine Times name, and one location operating as Shima's Supermarket in Waimānalo.

== History ==
Times Supermarkets was founded in 1949 by brothers Albert and Wallace Teruya, sons of Okinawan immigrants. The two opened their first store in Honolulu and soon began expanding statewide. Times is the second-largest and second-oldest supermarket chain in the state (Foodland, which is larger, was founded in 1948, a year before Times began operations). It also competes with Safeway, Costco, Don Quijote, Target, and Walmart.

In 2002, Times Supermarkets was sold by the Teruyas to PAQ, a Stockton, California-based operator of Food 4 Less stores. After the Teruyas sold Times, they would later become owners of the Ilima Hotel in Honolulu.

In 2008, Times acquired Shima's Market in Waimānalo.

In 2009 Times acquired another Honolulu-based supermarket chain, Star Markets, from the Fujieki family, giving them more locations in the Honolulu area. Star was Honolulu's first supermarket chain, having started in 1940. Times then sold two of Star's sevens stores to CVS Pharmacy (to convert into Longs Drugs), because CVS wanted to block Walgreens from entering their respective markets. At the time, CVS had been acquiring as many locations as possible to slow Walgreens' expansion.

In 2011, Times bought the Big Save chain of supermarkets on Kauai from the Kawakami and Furugen families. As a result of this acquisition, five of the six Big Save locations were kept, but one was closed due to a Times store located nearby.

On June 28, 2017, PAQ, which operated Times, Big Save, and Shima's under the subsidiary QSI, Inc., announced that it has sold the stores to the Honolulu-based division of Tokyo-based Don Quijote Holdings Co., Ltd, using an executed a stock purchase agreement with the sale closing in the 3rd quarter of 2017. The deal combined Times with three Don Quijote stores and two Marukai stores on Oʻahu. In a statement from Edwin Sawai, president of Don Quijote (USA) Co., Ltd. and Marukai Hawaii Co. Ltd., he stated “The opportunity to welcome the Times Supermarket family of stores and their employees to our ohana is exciting for us,” and added that “We are confident that we will successfully work together, share ideas and learn from each other’s combined experiences to best serve Hawaii. For more than 68 years, Times Supermarket has been a local favorite and pillar of Hawaii’s retail community. We look forward to continuing their history and success in the islands.” Don Quijote later re-branded as Pan Pacific International Holdings due to their ventures expanding beyond discount retailing.
