= Patrick O'Sullivan (disambiguation) =

Patrick O'Sullivan (born 1985) is an American ice hockey player.

Patrick O'Sullivan may also refer to:

- Patrick O'Sullivan (author), Irish author and railway historian from Cahersiveen
- Patrick O'Sullivan (businessman) (born 1949), Irish businessman, chairman of Old Mutual
- Patrick O'Sullivan (lawyer) (1835–1887), British lawyer
- Patrick O'Sullivan (Queensland politician) (1818–1904), Legislative Assembly of Queensland member from Ipswich, 1860–1863
- Patrick B. O'Sullivan (1887–1978), U.S. Representative from Connecticut
- Patrick O'Sullivan, convicted of the murder of Patrick Henry Cronin in 1889
- Patrick O'Sullivan, actor who portrayed Chris in The Cavanaughs web series

== See also ==
- Pádraig O'Sullivan, Irish Fianna Fáil politician
- Pat O'Sullivan (born 1926), American golfer
- Pat Sullivan (disambiguation)
