= Maurice Sullivan =

Maurice Sullivan may refer to:

- Maurice J. Sullivan (1884–1953), American politician in Nevada
- Maurice J. "Sully" Sullivan (1909–1998), Irish-born businessman in Hawaii
- Maurice S. Sullivan (1893–1935), biographer of Jedediah Smith

== See also ==
- Maurice O'Sullivan (disambiguation)
