= O'Sullivan family =

Irish Gaelic clan

O'Sullivan Ó Súilleabháin
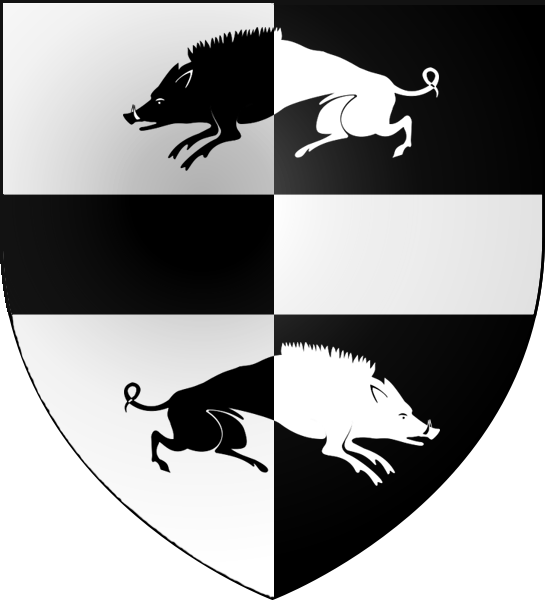
- Arms of O'Sullivan
- Parent house: Eóganachta
- Country: Kingdom of Desmond; Kingdom of Ireland
- Founder: Suilebhan mac Maolura
- Final ruler: Donal Cam O'Sullivan Beare
- Titles: Count of Berehaven; Lord of Knockgraffon; Lord of Cappanacusha; Lord of Beare; Lord of Dunkerron; Sullivan baronets
- Cadet branches: O'Sullivan Mór; O'Sullivan Beare; O'Sullivan MacCragh; MacCrohan; McGillicuddy; Labhrais-Clanlawrence

O'Sullivan (Irish: Ó Súilleabháin, Súileabhánach) is an Irish Gaelic clan based most prominently in what is today County Cork and County Kerry. According to traditional genealogy, the O’Sullivans were descended from the ancient Eóganacht Chaisil sept of Cenél Fíngin, the founder of the clan who was placed in the 9th century, eight generations removed from Fíngen mac Áedo Duib, king of Cashel or Munster from 601 to 618. Later, they became the chief princes underneath their close kinsmen, the MacCarthy dynasty, in the small but powerful Kingdom of Desmond, successor of Cashel/Munster. The last independent ruler of the clan was Donal Cam O'Sullivan Beare, who was defeated in the Nine Years' War of 1594–1603.

== Naming conventions ==
Male	Daughter	Wife (Long)	Wife (Short)
Ó Súilleabháin	Ní Shúilleabháin	Bean Uí Shúilleabháin	Uí Shúilleabháin

== History ==
=== Legendary genealogy ===
According to the genealogy recorded in the 17th-century Leabhar na nGenealach, the O'Sullivan clan claimed descent from the Eóganachta dynasty of the Kings of Munster (and via them, ultimately, from Milesius, Fénius Farsaid and Adam). The legendary founder of the clan, Suilebhan mac Maolura is recorded as born in 834 the grandfather of Eochaid (An Ui Suilleabhainn) born in 874, as a descendant from the line of the kings of Munster, of the Eóganachta dynasty, eight generations after Fíngen mac Áedo Duib (d. 618).

=== Medieval period ===
Following the Norman invasion of Ireland in 1169–71, Norman incursions into Munster were made in the 1180s. The O'Sullivan clan was forced from their original homeland in County Tipperary by the Normans in 1193. Dunlong son of Giolla Mochoda in 1196 from Tipperary to County Kerry.

They divided into several branches and the two main ones are:

- O'Sullivan Mór (Mór indicating larger or greater) in south Kerry, and
- O'Sullivan Beare in the Beara Peninsula, West Cork and South Kerry

The cadet branch of the O'Sullivan Mór dynasty is McGillycuddy of the Reeks (Mac Giolla Mochuda). Of the O'Sullivans Beare the cadet branch was the sept Mac Fineen Duff (Mac Fíghin Dúibh), now thought to be defunct.

The "Beare" suffix came from the Beara peninsula that was named for the Spanish princess Bera, the wife of the first King of Munster. They continued to be harassed by the Normans and so allied themselves with the McCarthys and the O'Donoghues.

The three clans defeated the Normans in 1261 at the battle of Caisglin near Kilgarvan, just north of Kenmare. They were again victorious the following year. These two battles settled the boundaries between the Normans of north Kerry (the FitzGeralds) and the three Gaelic families of south Kerry and west Cork.

=== Early modern period ===
The O'Sullivan Beare clan was further divided in 1592. When Dónal O'Sullivan, the chieftain, was slain in 1563 his son of the same name was but a child two years of age. The Irish laws of Tanistry required that the title of chieftain be passed on to the most capable of the dead chief's family. As a result, the clan decided that Owen, one of the brothers of the dead chief, would take over control of the clan and become Lord of Beare and Bantry. Owen acknowledged the English crown and was knighted by Queen Elizabeth.

In 1587 Dónal, now twenty-six years old, decided to claim leadership of the clan. He petitioned the authorities in Dublin, using primogeniture as the basis for his claim, whereby the oldest son should inherit his father's title regardless of his age at the time of his father's death. The English Commission in Dublin was receptive to his argument since they preferred to have the English procedure followed throughout Ireland. In addition Sir Owen had lost influence in Dublin due to implication in the Desmond Rebellion. The Commission found in favor of Dónal, who was now The O'Sullivan Beare. Sir Owen had to be content with Whiddy island and part of Bantry. He died the following year and was succeeded by his son, another Sir Owen.

The O'Sullivans and other clans provided shelter to 12-year-old Gerald FitzGerald when troops sought to capture him as the last heir to the Earlship of Desmond.

In the late 1590s, it was the Sullivan Mor clan and their close allies the McSweenys who bore the brunt of the fighting with the English forces. Donal, however, held the O'Sullivan Beare clan, held back from the fighting until the O'Donnells and O'Neills of Ulster entered the campaign.

=== After 1600 ===
By the year 1600 all of Munster was in a turmoil. As retribution for their support of the Desmond rebellion, the Munster clans lost over 500,000 acres (2,000 km^{2}) of their land to English settlers. When the Earl of Clancarty died in 1596 his lands were parceled out as well to settlers.

King Philip III of Spain agreed to send help to his co-religionists in Ireland - the 4th Spanish Armada was sent, under the command of Don Juan del Águila. Rather than landing in Ulster, as suggested by O'Neill, the Spanish forces landed at Kinsale in County Cork to avoid encountering English warships in the Irish Sea. The war weary and decimated Munster clans had difficulty mustering an army to join the Ulster and Spanish forces. The Spanish were given the responsibility of forming the garrisons for the castles of the O'Driscolls and the O'Sullivans so as to free the Irish troops for the battles to come. The rest of the four thousand Spanish soldiers remained at Kinsale to await the arrival of the Ulster forces.

Donal O'Sullivan Beare was given command of the Munster forces, which consisted mainly of soldiers of his clan and those of the O'Driscolls, McSweeneys, and O'Connor Kerry. Daniel O'Sullivan Mor could only contribute token support because of the losses he had sustained in the previous years. Dónal marched to Kinsale with an army of one thousand men. He sent a letter to King Philip swearing allegiance to him as his sovereign. The letter was intercepted by English agents and was later used as reason for denying him pardon.

On 24 December 1601 at the coming of dawn the battle began. It was over in a matter of hours. It was a resounding defeat for the Irish forces. This was due in large part to the reluctance of the Spanish troops to leave the protection of the walled city of Kinsale and join the battle until it was over. O'Neill retreated back to Tyrone with his battered troops. O'Donnell handed over command of his soldiers to his brother and embarked for Spain to plead for more help from King Philip. General Aquila sued for peace and Lord Mountjoy, commander of the English, was only too happy to accept his request. Aquila agreed to surrender the castl.es his troops were defending. This meant that the O'Sullivans and the O'Driscolls had to fight the Spanish to regain their castles. Donal O'Sullivan wrote to King Philip complaining about the behavior of Aquila. When Aquila returned to Spain he was held in contempt by King Philip and put under house arrest.

Many of the O'Sullivan clan's non-combatants were sent to the island of Dursey to keep them out of harm's way. An English force led by a John Bostock attacked the small garrison guarding the island. They butchered the entire population of the island, women, children, and the garrison. They cast their bodies, some while they were still alive, onto the rocks below the cliff overlooking the sea.

The O'Sullivan Beare principal fortress, Dunboy Castle, was destroyed in the Siege of Dunboy in 1602 and its garrison was put to death by hanging.

Dónal O'Sullivan and approximately one thousand followers consisting of four hundred soldiers and the rest civilians began a journey to Leitrim to the castle of his friend Ó Ruairc (O'Rourke). He believed that he could hold out longer amongst his northern allies, the O'Donnells and O'Neills.

Carew declared them outlaws and decreed that anyone that aided them would be dealt with as outlaws as well. Throughout the 300-mile (480 km) trek they were attacked by English forces and Irish that were loyal to Elizabeth. The countryside had been ravaged by war and famine; the people along the way were trying to stay alive themselves. They could ill afford to provide any aid or food. They began the march on 31 December 1602. A detailed account of the march is provided by Philip O'Sullivan Beare, a nephew of Dónal O'Sullivan.

== Notable members ==
- Donal Cam O'Sullivan Beare (1561–1613), Irish chieftain

== See also ==
- Gaelic nobility of Ireland
- Sullivan baronets
- O'Sullivan (surname)
- Sullivan (surname)
