= Foodland Hawaii =

Supermarket chain in Hawaii

Foodland
- Type: Subsidiary
- Industry: Retail
- Founded: 1948 (Honolulu, Hawaii)
- Headquarters: Honolulu,
- Number of locations: 29
- Products: Bakery, dairy, deli, frozen foods, general grocery, meat, pharmacy, produce, seafood, snacks, liquor
- Parent: Sullivan Family of Companies
- Website: foodland.com

Foodland Hawaii store in Pupukea, O‘ahu

Foodland (full name: Foodland Super Market, Ltd.) is an American supermarket chain, headquartered in Honolulu, Hawaii. Foodland operates 32 stores throughout the state of Hawaii under the "Foodland," "Foodland Farms," and "Sack 'N Save" names. The chain serves as the flagship of the Sullivan Family of Companies.

== History ==
The chain opened its first store in Honolulu's Market City in 1948. The founder, Maurice J. "Sully" Sullivan came from Ireland to Hawaii and opened a supermarket called Foodland. The store expanded to Kauai in 1967, to Maui in 1970, and to the Big Island in 1971. Foodland is now the largest locally owned supermarket chain in Hawaii, as well as the oldest. It competes with another Honolulu-based supermarket chain with locations statewide, Times Supermarkets, and national and international chains, including Safeway, Costco, Don Quixote, and Walmart. Appointed in 1998, the current chairman and CEO of Foodland is Sullivan's daughter, Jenai S. Wall.

Foodland introduced a frequent shopper program in 1995, called the Maika'i program.
