= Joe Sullivan (disambiguation) =

Joe Sullivan (1906–1971) was a jazz pianist.

Joe Sullivan may also refer to:

- Joe Sullivan (pitcher) (1910–1985), Major League Baseball pitcher
- Joe Sullivan (shortstop) (1870–1897), Major League Baseball shortstop
- Joe Sullivan (footballer) (1877–1935), Australian rules footballer
- Joe Sullivan (cybersecurity) (born 1968), American cybersecurity professional

== See also ==
- Joseph Sullivan (disambiguation)
- Jo Sullivan, soprano
