= Patrick Sullivan =

Patrick or Pat Sullivan may refer to:

== Sports ==
- Pat Sullivan (American football) (1950–2019), American football player and coach
- Patrick Sullivan (American football executive), former New England Patriots general manager
- Pat Sullivan (third baseman) (1861–1901), American baseball player
- Pat Sullivan (baseball manager) (1854–1896), American baseball manager
- Pat Sullivan (basketball) (born 1971), American basketball coach
- Patrick Sullivan (footballer) (born 1982), football player for Shamrock Rovers
- Pat Sullivan (soccer) (born 1971), Canadian former soccer player

== Politicians ==
- Patrick Joseph Sullivan (1865–1935), US senator for Wyoming
- Patrick Sullivan (Wyoming politician), member of the Wyoming House of Representatives
- Patrick J. Sullivan (Pennsylvania politician) (1877–1946), US congressman for Pennsylvania
- Pat Sullivan (politician) (born 1962), politician in the State of Washington

== Others ==
- Pat Sullivan (film producer) (1887–1933), Australian film producer and animator
- Pat Sullivan (programmer), American software engineer
- Pat Sullivan (trade unionist) (born 1893), Irish-born Canadian trade union leader
- Patrick F. Sullivan, American psychiatric geneticist
- Patrick Sullivan, character in The Accidental Husband
- Patrick Sullivan, real name of actor Barry Sullivan

== See also ==
- Patrick O'Sullivan (disambiguation)
- Patricia Sullivan (disambiguation),
