= Arnold Sullivan =

English cricketer

Personal information
- Full name: Arnold Moon Sullivan
- Born: 30 August 1878; Kirkbymoorside, Yorkshire, England
- Died: 27 June 1943 (aged 64); Meads, Sussex, England
- Batting: Right-handed
- Role: Occasional wicket-keeper
- Relatives: Joseph Sullivan (brother)

Domestic team information
- Years: Team
- 1901: Sussex
- 1899–1900: Cambridge University

Career statistics
Competition	First-class
Matches	13
Runs scored	341
Batting average	17.05
100s/50s	–/2
Top score	63
Balls bowled	–
Wickets	–
Bowling average	–
5 wickets in innings	–
10 wickets in match	–
Best bowling	–
Catches/stumpings	10/–
- Source: Cricinfo, 19 October 2012

Arnold Moon Sullivan (30 August 1878 – 27 June 1943) was an English cricketer. Sullivan was a right-handed batsman who occasionally fielded as a wicket-keeper. He was born at Kirkbymoorside, Yorkshire.

Educated at St Peter's School, York followed by Christ's College, Cambridge, Sullivan made his first-class debut for Cambridge University against AJ Webbe's XI in 1899. He made eight further first-class appearances for the university, the last of which came against the Marylebone Cricket Club in 1900. In his nine first-class matches for the university, he scored 313 runs at an average of 19.56, with a high score of 63. He made two half centuries, with both coming against Surrey in 1900 at Fenner's. In the 1901 County Championship, he played first-class cricket for Sussex, making four appearances against Somerset, Lancashire, Hampshire and Yorkshire.

He died at Meads, Sussex, on 27 June 1943.
