= Don Quijote (store) =

Japanese discount chain store

Coordinates: 35°39′44.73″N 139°44′5.11″E

Don Quijote Co., Ltd.

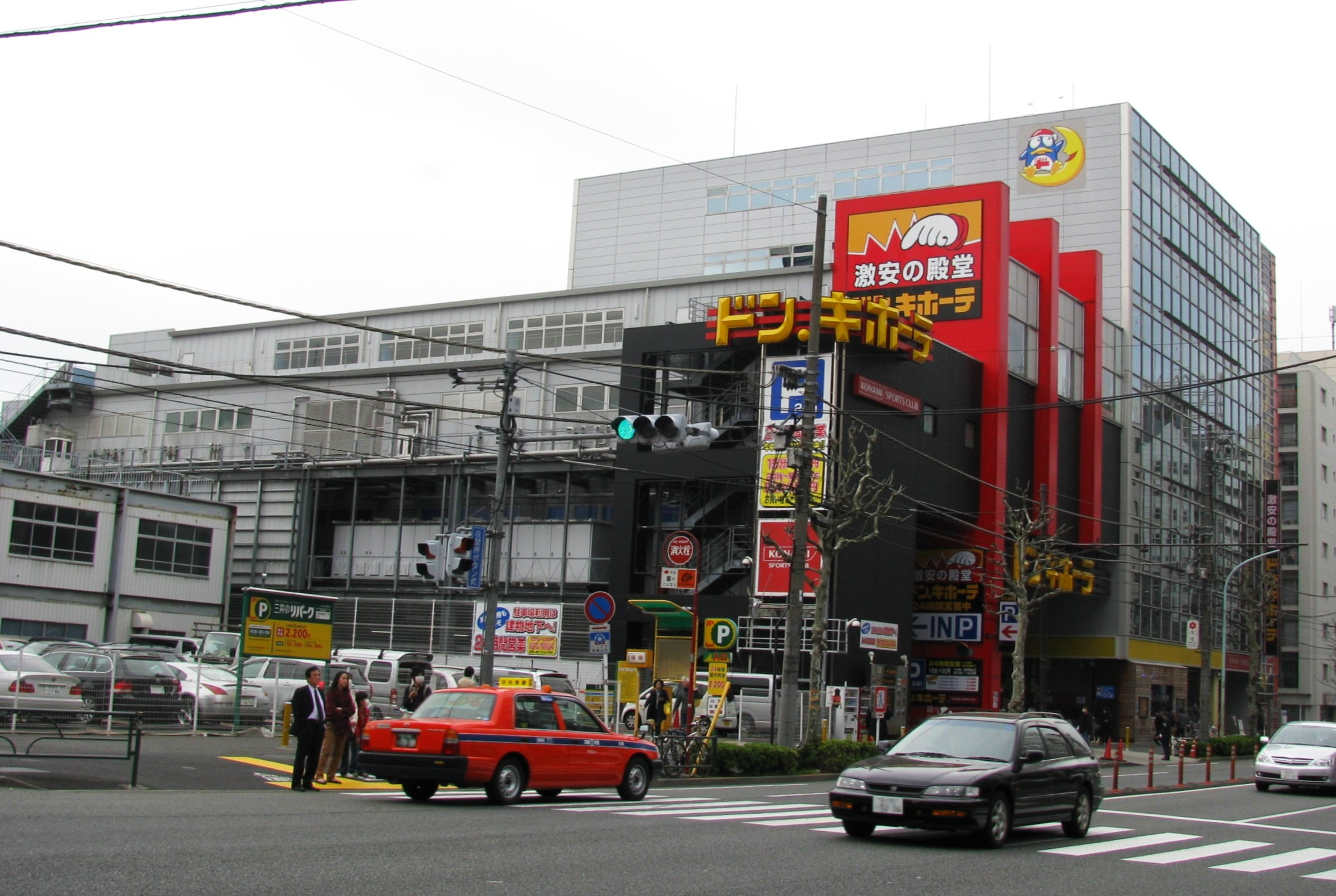
- Headquarters of Don Quijote in Meguro, Tokyo
- Native name: 株式会社ドン・キホーテ
- Type: Public K.K.
- Traded as: TYO: 7532
- Industry: Retail
- Founded: September 5, 1980
- Founder: Takao Yasuda
- Headquarters: Meguro, Tokyo, Japan
- Number of locations: 322 stores (April 2019)
- Area served: Japan, Singapore, China (Hong Kong and Macau), Thailand, Taiwan, Malaysia, and the United States (California, Hawaii, and Guam)
- Products: Clothing, food, jewelry, housewares, tools, sporting goods and electronics
- Revenue: ▲¥1.94 trillion (2022)
- Operating income: ▲¥105.26 billion (2022)
- Net income: ▲¥66.17 billion (2022)
- Total assets: ▲¥1.48 trillion (2022)
- Total equity: ▲¥461.54 billion (2022)
- Number of employees: 4,391 (2010)
- Parent: Pan Pacific International Holdings Corporation
- Subsidiaries: Don Quijote America
- Website: donki.com (in Japanese)

Don Quijote Co., Ltd. (株式会社ドン・キホーテ, kabushiki gaisha Don Kihōte), often referred to by its shortened name Donki (ドンキ), is a Japanese discount store chain. Donki stores provide a wide range of products, from basic groceries to electronics and clothing. They notably tend to stay open until early morning or even remain open 24/7, and products are packed from ceiling to floor in a distinct merchandising strategy.

As of 2024, it has over 160 locations throughout Japan and three in Hawaii, one of the latter under the name "Don Don Donki". In addition, seventeen in Singapore, eleven in Hong Kong, four in Malaysia, eight in Thailand, five in Taiwan, two in Macau, and one in Guam are branded as Don Don Donki.

== History ==
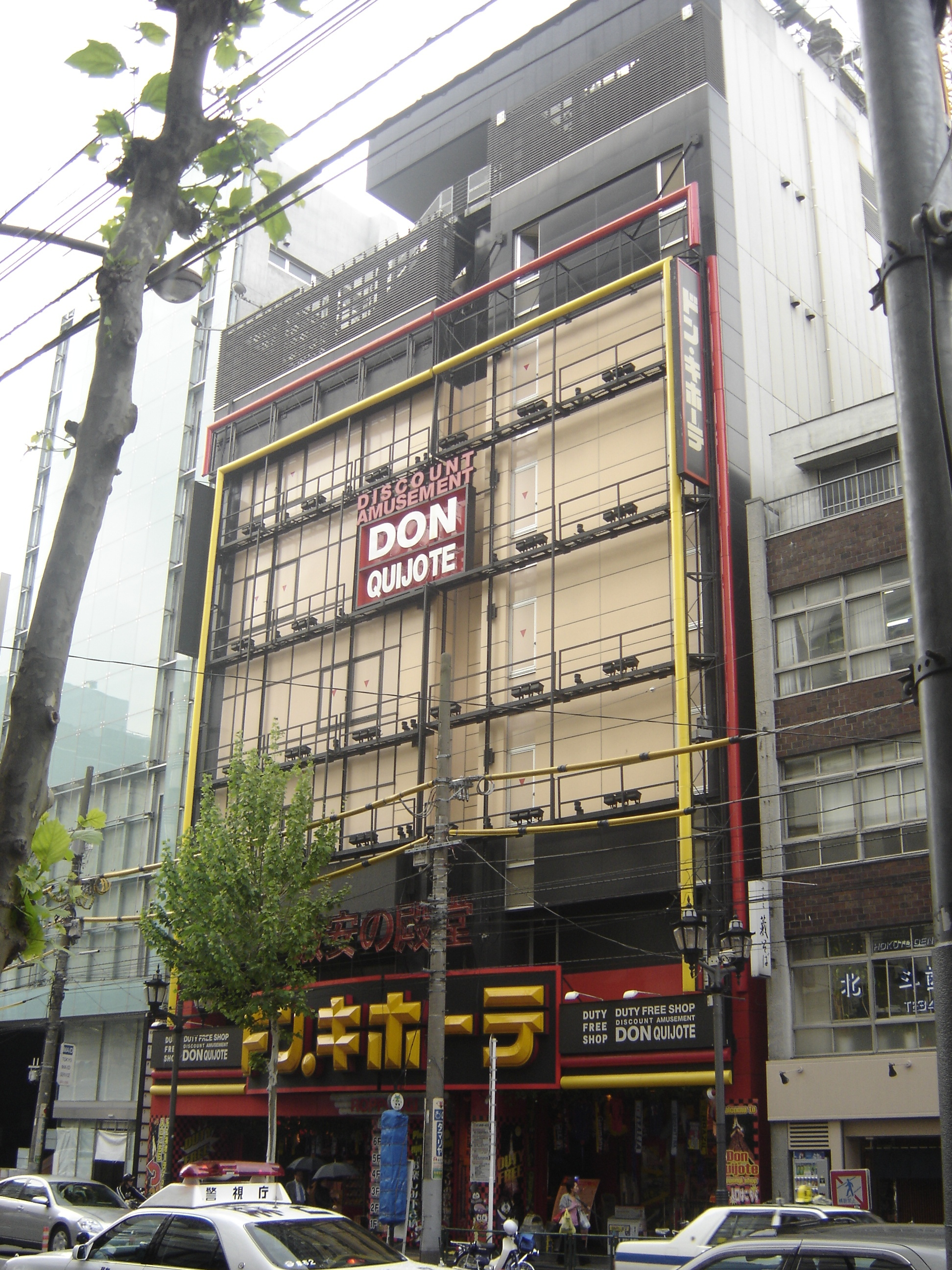
The front of the Don Quijote building in Roppongi

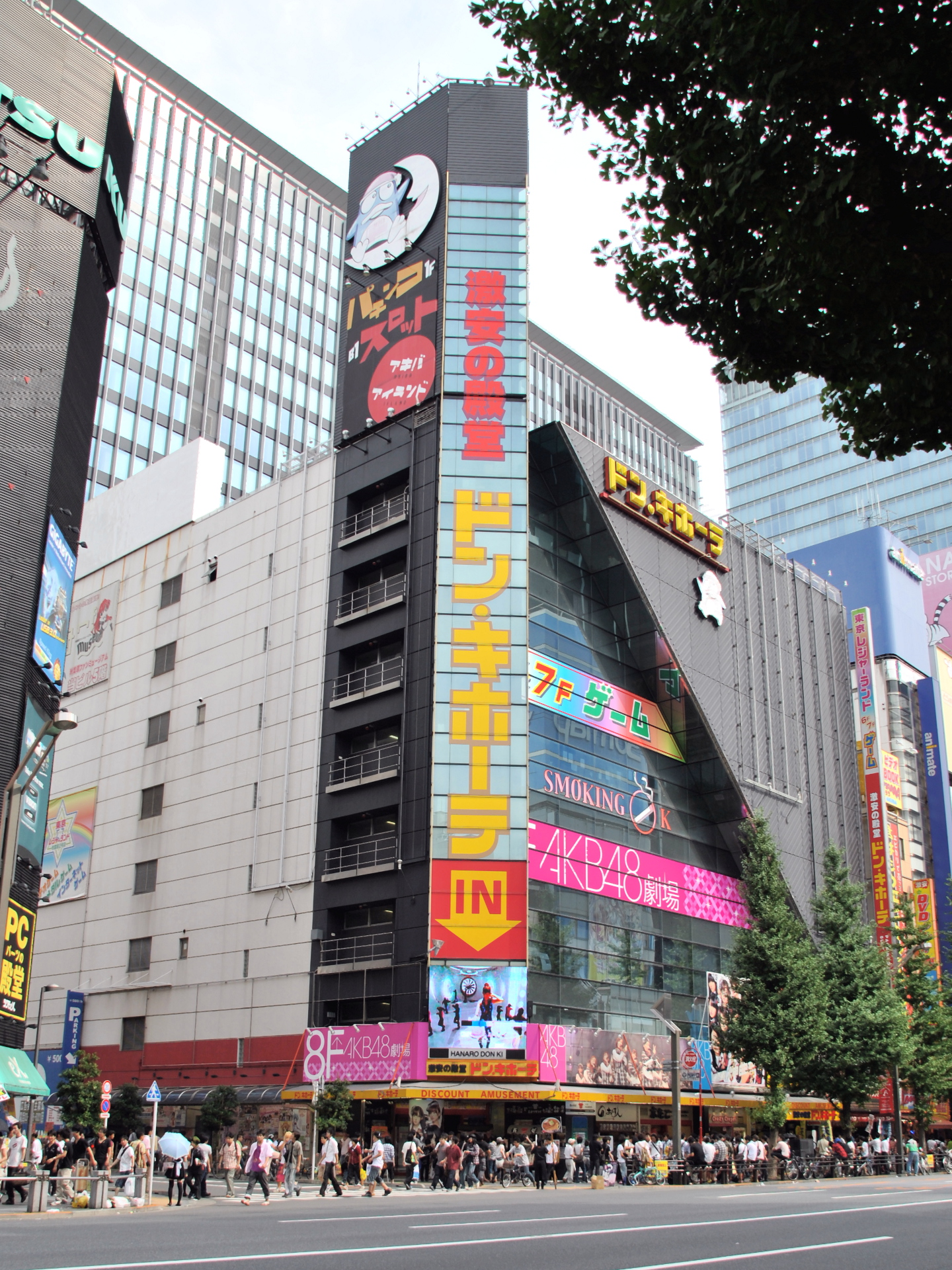
Don Quijote in Akihabara

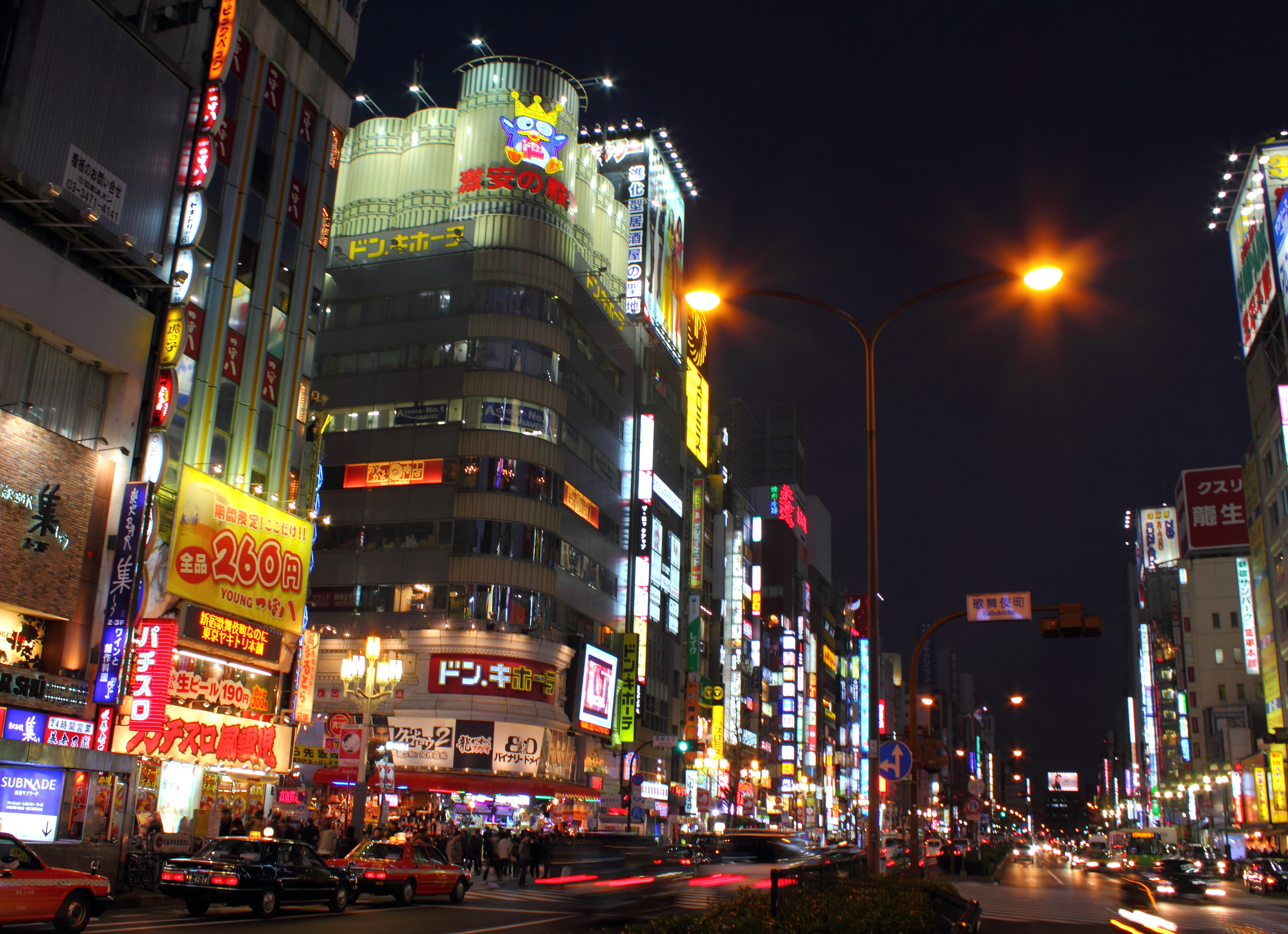
Don Quijote building in Shinjuku

=== Origins ===
Founded by Takao Yasuda, Don Quijote opened its first store in Suginami, Tokyo, in September 1980 under its original name, Just Co. Originally a retail store, Just Co. quickly switched to wholesale in 1982.

In March 1989, the company opened its first "Don Quijote" named store in Fuchu, Tokyo. With the name change, the store also changed its primary business from wholesale to retail. In 1995, Just Co. followed suit and changed its corporate name to Don Quijote Co., Ltd. In June 1998, the company was listed on the Tokyo Stock Exchange.

As one of the leading discount stores in Japan, the end of the Japanese economic bubble did not severely affect the company. Instead, the sudden economic uncertainty caused the Japanese public to become more thrifty and therefore helped to boost sales at its stores during the 1990s and early 2000s.

In 2005, idol group AKB48 opened its theater on the eighth floor of the Don Quijote Akihabara Outlet in Tokyo. Also that year, a Ferris wheel opened at the facade of the Don Quijote Dōtonbori branch in Osaka.

In October 2007, Don Quijote purchased the ailing Nagasakiya chain for 140 billion yen. This store and 3 other group companies went defunct in October 2017 as creditors have pulled the plug on their combined 432 billion yen of debts. Creditors continue to bankroll the rest of the group.

In June 2017, PAQ, which operated Honolulu-based Times, Big Save and Shima under the subsidiary QSI, Inc., sold the 24 stores it owns in Hawaii to Honolulu-based Don Quijote (USA), using an executed stock purchase agreement with the sale closing in the 3rd quarter of 2017. The deal will combine Times with three Don Quijote stores and two Marukai stores on Oahu. In a statement from Edwin Sawai, president of Don Quijote (USA) Co., Ltd. and Marukai Hawaii Co. Ltd., he said that “The opportunity to welcome the Times Supermarket family of stores and their employees to our ohana is exciting for us,” and added that “We are confident that we will successfully work together, share ideas and learn from each other's combined experiences to best serve Hawaii. For more than 68 years, Times Supermarket has been a local favorite and pillar of Hawaii's retail community. We look forward to continuing their history and success in the islands.”

=== Further expansions ===
==== Singapore ====
Don Quijote opened its first Southeast Asian store at Orchard Central, Singapore, in December 2017. These stores are branded "Don Don Donki" as the Don Quijote name was in use by a local restaurant. Don Quijote opened a second store at the 100AM Mall in Tanjong Pagar in June 2018. There are 17 Don Don Donki stores in Singapore:

- 100 AM
- Bukit Panjang Plaza
- City Square Mall
- Clarke Quay Central
- Downtown East
- HarbourFront Centre
- Jem
- Jewel Changi Airport
- Jurong Point
- Northpoint City
- Orchard Central
- Paya Lebar Quarter
- Square 2
- Suntec City
- Tampines 1
- Tiong Bahru Plaza
- Waterway Point

Singapore has the most Don Don Donki stores outside of the home islands. Takao Yasuda, the company's founder, also lives in Singapore, specifically at Sentosa.

==== Hong Kong ====
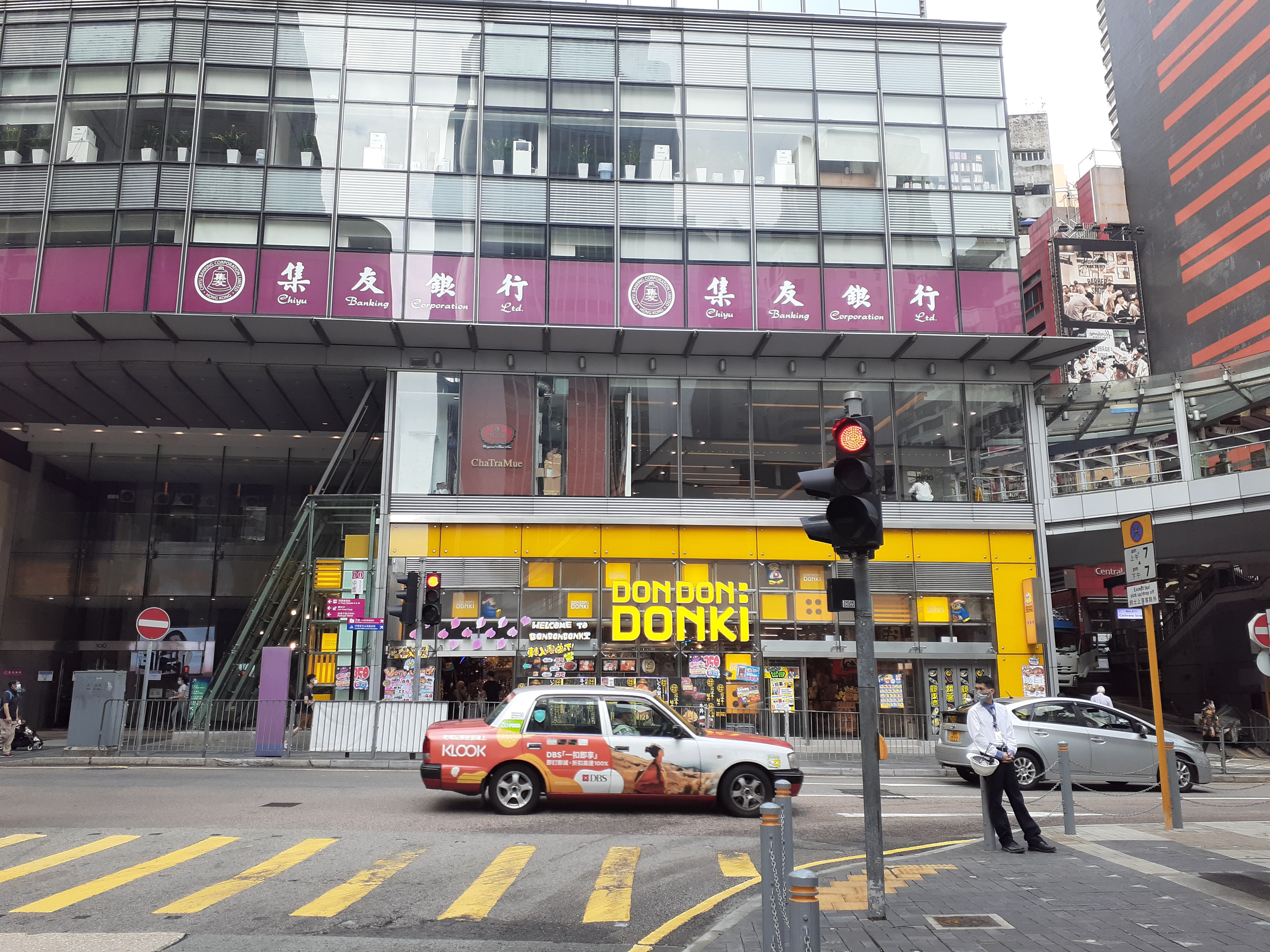
Don Don Donki at Central, HK

Don Don Donki also expanded to Hong Kong with five outlets: one at Mira Place 2 in Tsim Sha Tsui, one at OP Mall in Tsuen Wan, one at Pearl City in Causeway Bay, one at 100QRC in Central and one at Monterey Place in Tseung Kwan O. The chain opened one more store at the Island Resort Mall in Siu Sai Wan in February 2021, and at TMT Plaza in Tuen Mun in July 2021.

The store at Amoy Plaza in Jordan Valley opened in January 2022, and another store opened at Fashion World in Whampoa Garden in August 2022. Don Don Donki opened another store at Plaza Hollywood in Diamond Hill in 2023, followed by its Mong Kok branch at MPM Mandarin Arcade in 2024.

==== Thailand ====
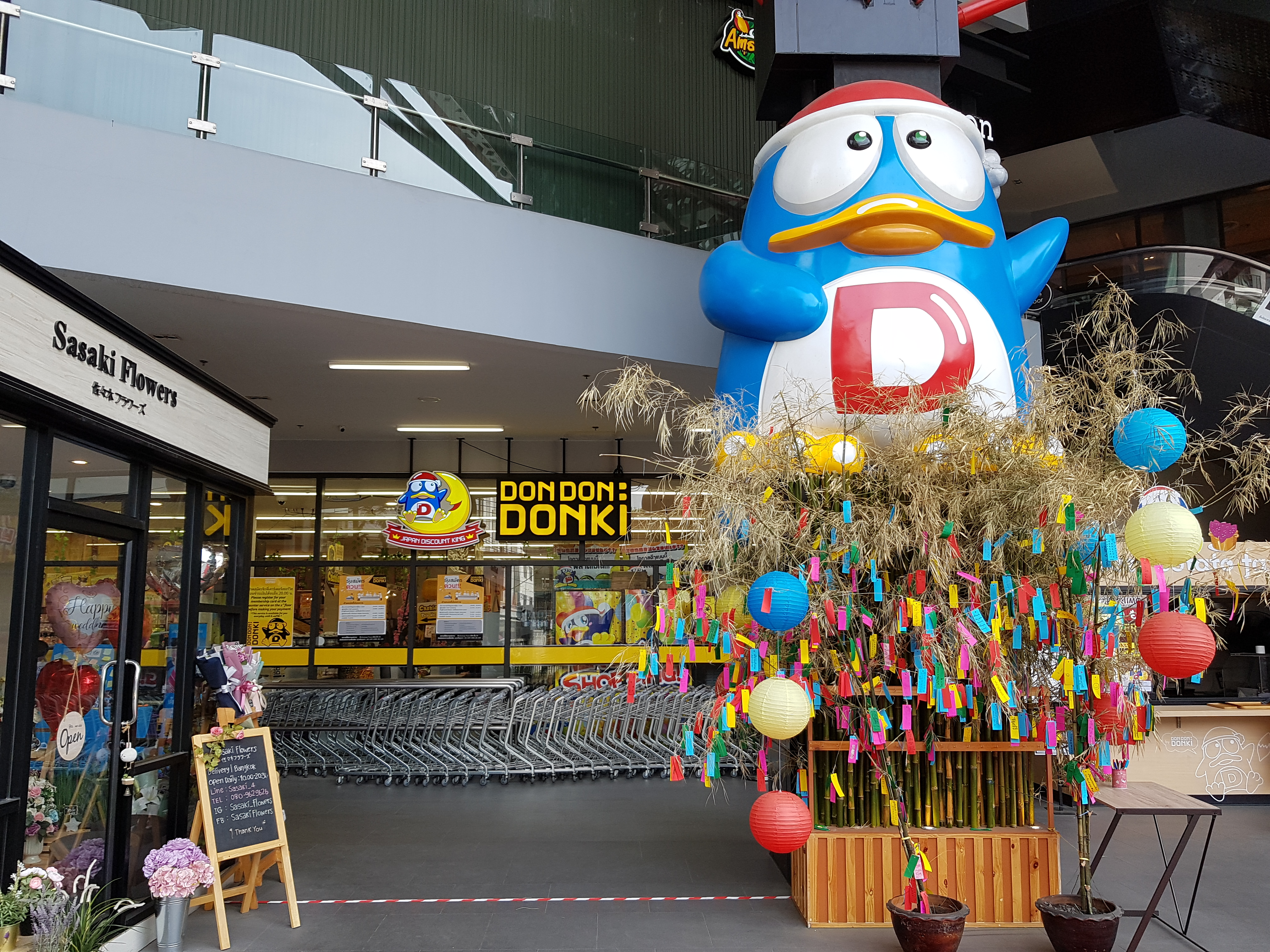
Don Don Donki Thonglor branch, the first Don Don Donki in Thailand

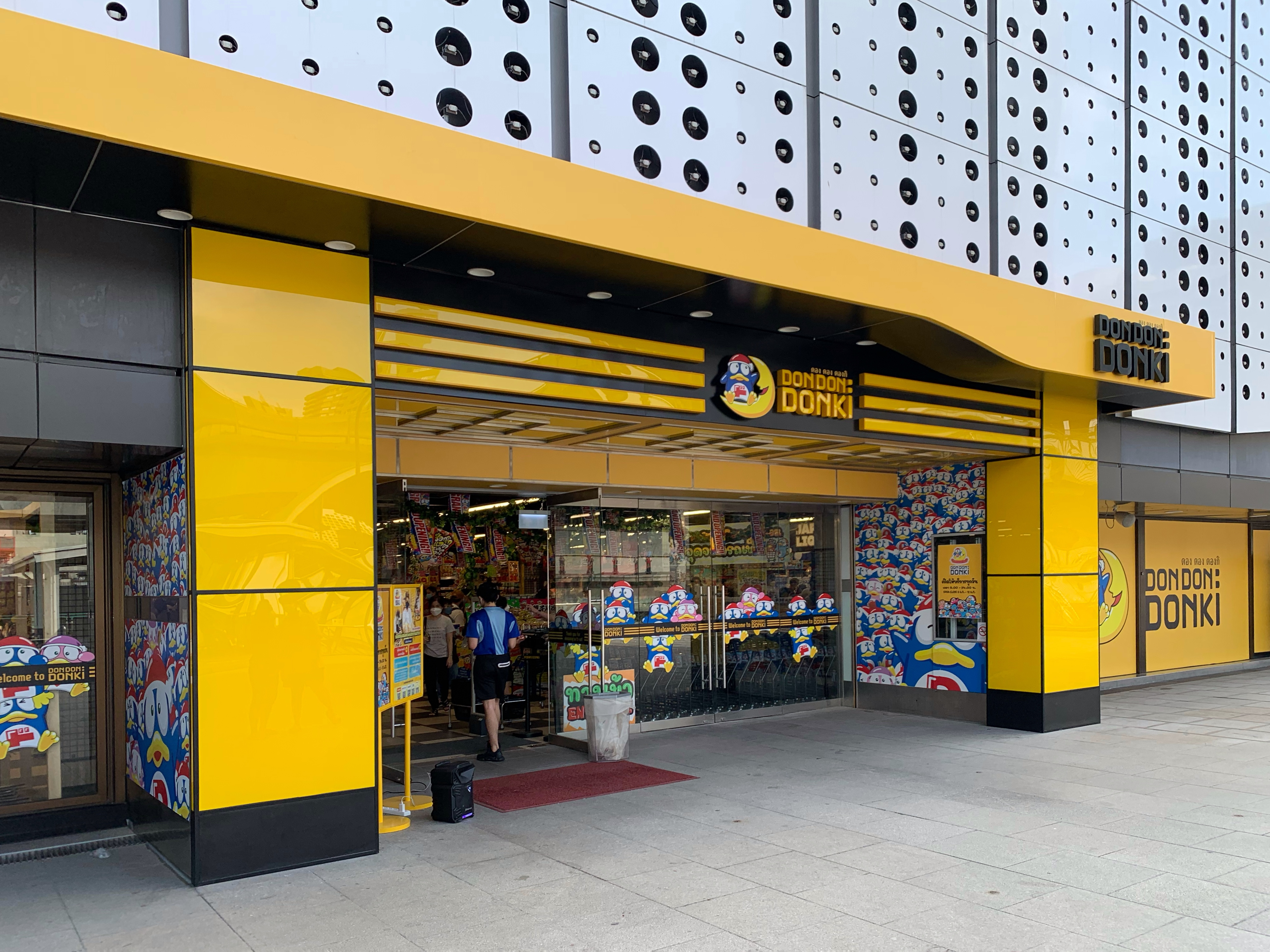
Don Don Donki at MBK Center, seen from the footbridge connecting the shopping mall to National Stadium BTS station

In Thailand, 2 Don Don Donki stores have been closed, and 8 others are currently operational.

Branch name	Opening date	Closing date	Located in	District	Province	Notes
Thonglor	22 February 2562 (2019)	currently operational	Donki Mall Thonglor	Watthana	Bangkok	
The Market Bangkok	31 March 2563 (2020)	4 September 2565 (2022)	The Market Bangkok	Pathum Wan	Bangkok	Closed due to COVID-19 pandemic, moved to MBK Center
Seacon Square	1 October 2564 (2021)	currently operational	Seacon Square	Prawet	Bangkok	
MBK Center	21 December 2564 (2021)	currently operational	MBK Center	Pathum Wan	Bangkok	
Seacon Bangkae	20 June 2565 (2022)	currently operational	Seacon Bangkae	Phasi Charoen	Bangkok	
Si Racha	9 September 2565 (2022)	currently operational	J-Park Sriracha Nihon Mura	Si Racha district	Chonburi	
Si Lom	23 January 2566 (2023)	currently operational	Thaniya Plaza	Bang Rak	Bangkok	
Fashion Island	20 Oct 2566 (2023)	currently operational	Fashion Island	Khan Na Yao	Bangkok	
Bang Kapi	24 November 2566 (2023)	12 May 2568 (2025)	The Mall Lifestore Bangkapi	Bang Kapi	Bangkok	Moved to Seacon Square and Fashion Island branches.
Central WestGate	9 September 2568 (2025)	currently operational	Central WestGate	Bang Yai	Nonthaburi	

==== Taiwan ====
In January 2021, the first Don Don Donki store in Taiwan was opened in the Ximending Shopping District, Taipei, amid the coronavirus pandemic. The three-floor outlet is open 24 hours a day and is located near Ximen metro station. It attracted more than 500 people who lined up in front of the outlet before its grand opening.

In January 2022, the second Don Don Donki store in Taiwan opened in the Zhongxiao Xinsheng business district of Taipei. The second store is an underground single-floor store with an area of about 1,540 square meters (16,500 square feet). The store is located in close proximity to the Zhongxiao Xinsheng metro station. The Zhongxiao Xinsheng store will also open alongside four different kinds of booths selling Japanese foods, including MOCHI-MOCHI (selling freshly made mochi), Inari Sushi Tamaya (selling Inari sushi), Kondo (selling Japanese Wagyu beef skewers), and Color Food and Fitness (selling daifuku made with seasonal Japanese fruits).

In August 2023, the third Don Don Donki store in Taiwan opened in Citylink Nangang in Taipei.

In November 2023, the fourth Don Don Donki store in Taiwan opened in Tiger City in Taichung, with an area of about 1,800 square meters (20,000 square feet), which was the largest Don Don Donki in Taiwan to date.

In December 2023, the fifth Don Don Donki store in Taiwan opened in Talee Department Store in Kaohsiung. It is currently the largest Taiwanese Don Don Donki with the area of nearly 3,000 square meters (32,000 square feet). The opening attracted nearly 2,000 shoppers. This store contains three exclusive areas: Outdoor for outdoor products, Donki Sake for Japanese sake and Cocokawaii for kawaii items.

==== Malaysia ====
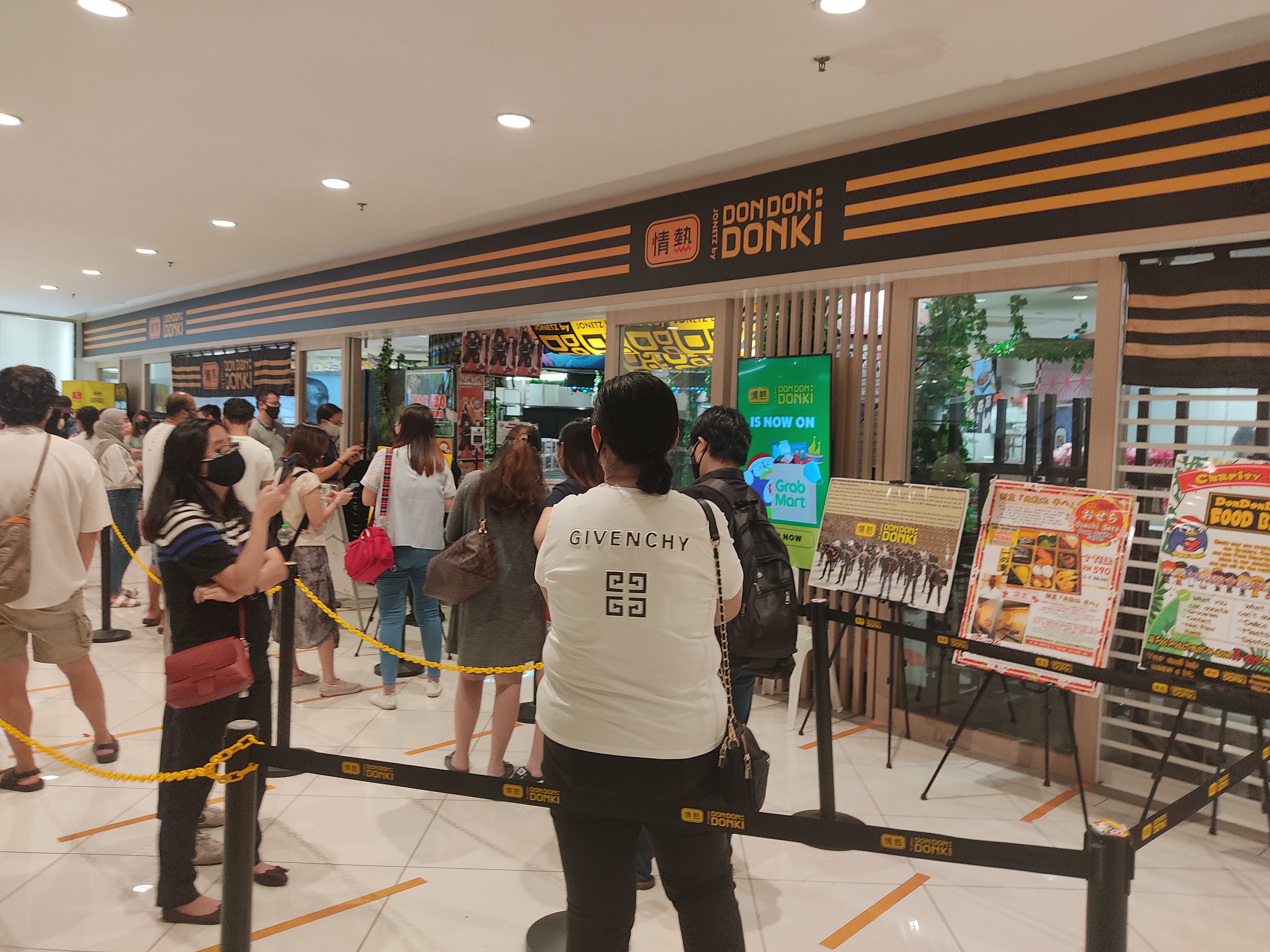
Don Don Donki in Lot 10, Kuala Lumpur

In March 2021, the first Don Don Donki store in Malaysia was opened in Lot 10 of Bukit Bintang, Kuala Lumpur, branded as "Jonetz by Don Don Donki". A second store opened in December 2021 at Tropicana Gardens Mall in the Petaling Jaya district of Selangor. It was the biggest outlet in Southeast Asia, spanning 42,243 sq ft across two levels of the mall. It closed permanently in May 2023.

A third store opened in Sunway Pyramid in October 2022. The fourth store that opened was in Mid Valley Megamall in January 2024. The fifth store was opened in NU Sentral in June 2024. The company also planned to open up 11 new outlets by June 2024.

==== Macau ====
Don Don Donki opened its first store in Macau in September 2021, at Fai Chi Kei. Don Don Donki also opened its store in Studio City located on the Cotai Strip in Macau in February 2024.

==== Guam ====
After breaking ground in February 2020, Don Don Donki was expected to open on Guam in the village of Tamuning under the name Village of Donki in September 2021. It opened in April 2024.

== Mascot ==
The character mascot of Don Quijote is called Donpen (ドンペン). Introduced in 1998, he is a blue penguin wearing a Santa hat and the Katakana character "do" (ド) on his stomach. For the international Don Don Donki branches, the "do" is replaced with the letter D. The company has a female equivalent known as Donko (ドンコ), who is colored pink with a heart on her stomach.

In December 2022, Don Quijote invited controversy when it announced Donpen would be replaced by an anthropomorphic depiction of the Katakana character "do" named Dojou-chan. The decision was reversed days later after an outpouring of support for the mascot on social media.

== Theme song ==
Don Quijote's theme song is "Miracle Shopping", sung by Maimi Tanaka, a former Don Quijote store employee. The song was later released as a maxi single in 1999 by Grace Notes Records.

Overseas markets use English, Mandarin and Cantonese versions of the theme song (depending on the country the store is located in) with the "Don Don Donki" name.

The song has been described as "catchy but annoying" and "highly repetitious but smartly done so". These quotes could be referring to the fact that the song has been specifically designed to be catchy and stick around in the shopper's head so that it constantly reminds them of the store.

== Commercial endorsements and collaborations ==
In August 2024, American singer-songwriter Bruno Mars collaborated with the store chain, appearing in the latest commercial ad. Mars, dancers Miyu, Haruka, Miyuri and Miku, and the store's mascot Donpen, dance around the Mega Don Quijote store situated in Shibuya, while picking up articles from the store's "People Brand 'Jōnetsu kakaku'" brand. Mars wrote the jingle and produced the commercial for the "Donki Ikuyo" (ドンキイクヨ; lit. "Let's Go to Donki") campaign. Besides the commercial, the Mars-Don Quijote collaboration included several exclusive goods released for a limited time in September. Mars shared the commercial in a reel on his Instagram account.

== Incidents ==
=== Arson ===
In December 2004, four stores in the Kantō area were damaged or destroyed by arson attacks. Three store employees, Morio Oshima, 39, Mai Koishi, 20, and Maiko Sekiguchi, 19, died in the first arson incident. In 2007, Noriko Watanabe, 49, was found guilty of setting the fires and sentenced to life imprisonment. Don Quijote received harsh criticism at the time for poor store layout that made it difficult to find exits.

=== Roller coaster ===
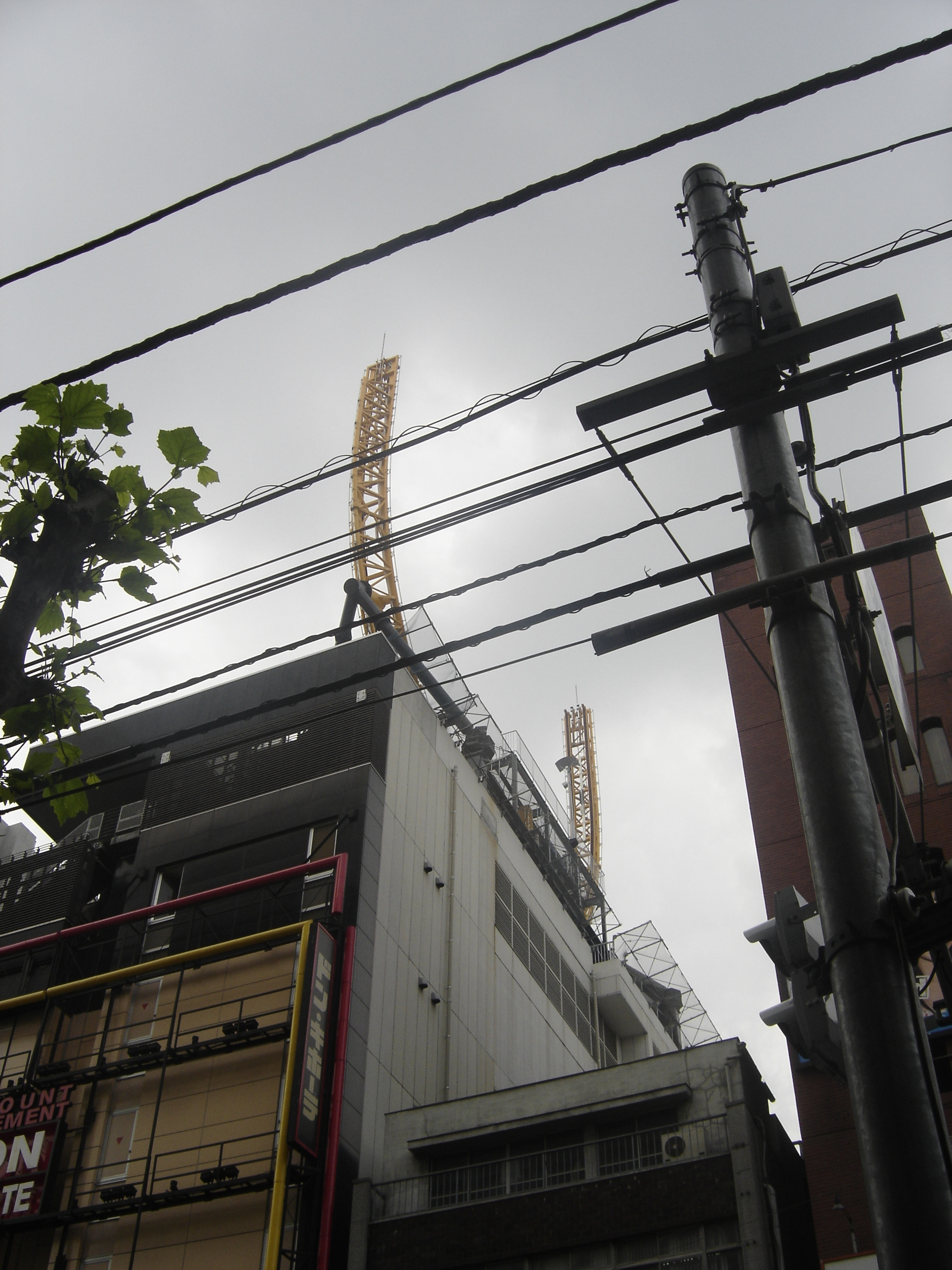
A street view of the roller coaster that sat atop Don Quijote Roppongi store

In 2003, Don Quijote and Intamin Japan entered into a contract in 2003 to manufacture a 12-passenger "half-pipe" roller coaster that would travel along a U-shaped track approximately 52 meters long, and to install it on the roof of Don Quijote's eight-storey store in Roppongi, a heavily populated area in the core of Tokyo. In September 2005, Intamin began building the coaster, with the expected opening for December 21, 2005. On December 8, the coaster's opening was postponed. Though Don Quijote followed all the legal procedures for the building of the coaster, many residents and businesses were against with the idea of having a roller coaster in their neighborhood for several reasons. The company considered that the coaster was too much of an economic risk, due to it not being part of the main business, so it voluntarily decided to postpone the opening.

Don Quijote sued Intamin for damages, seeking 859 million yen. The Tokyo District Court ruled in favor of Don Quijote on March 29, 2013, that Intamin had to pay the full amount, claiming that the company installed the coaster without adequately considering its impact on the surrounding area. According to the case, a test run was conducted in November 2005, when the coaster was nearly completed, but abnormal vibrations occurred. Judge Shigeru Ito pointed out that more than 90% of people questioned on the third and upper levels of the building felt the vibrations that were equivalent to a magnitude 3 earthquake. He ruled that the contract could be terminated because the vibrations on the structure were underestimated, and there were no measures taken to mitigate them. The coaster was removed in 2017.

== Overseas assets ==
Don Quijote purchased the Marukai Japanese chain stores in the United States in 2013, splitting it into Marukai and Tokyo Central Markets chains.

== In popular culture ==
Don Quijote stores are included as in-game shops in the Yakuza video game series. In 2009, Sega partnered with the store to advertise the release of Yakuza 3.

There is a Don Quijote store scene in TONIKAWA: Over the Moon to You when Nasa and Tsukasa went shopping in its second episode of its first season.
