= Patricia A. Sullivan (chancellor) =

Patricia A. Sullivan (November 22, 1939 - August 20, 2009). Patricia Ann Sullivan served as Chancellor of UNC Greensboro from January 1, 1995, until July 2008. During her time as Chancellor, she was responsible for more than $500 million in construction and developments on campus, including the science building, the music building, a residence hall, a promenade, and a renovated student center. She increased enrollment, endowment funds, exchange programs, and number of PhD programs. In April 2008, she was honored with the Old North State Award for her service to North Carolina (given by Governor Mike Easley); that same year the Sullivan Science Building on UNCG’s campus was named in her honor. She died on August 20, 2009, from pancreatic cancer at the age of 69.
