= James Sullivan (soldier) =

American Civil War veteran (1828–1918)

Peter Van Hoesen
- Born: January 24, 1828
- Died: May 10, 1918 (aged 90); Albany, New York
- Other name: James Sullivan
- Occupation: Soldier during the American Civil War
- Known for: Medal of Honor for actions at Fort Fisher, 1864

Peter Van Hoesen (January 24, 1828 – May 10, 1918), better known by his nom de guerre James Sullivan, was an American Civil War veteran. Having deserted, he later enlisted on behalf of another individual and performed an act of valor for which he was awarded the Medal of Honor. However, the circumstances of his enrollment denied him his right to a service pension and the recognition of the award.

== Biography ==
Peter Van Hoesen was born on January 24, 1828, and enlisted with the Army early in the conflict and deserted from Company B of the 18th New York Volunteer Infantry sometime prior to the Battle of Crampton's Gap on September 14, 1862. Van Hoesen was arrested in New Scotland, New York, for desertion on July 3, 1863, and was sent to Albany Barracks. His familiarity with the area helped him to escape and journey to New York City, where he met the real James Sullivan while in hiding. Sullivan was from Connecticut and had been recently drafted to serve in the 7th Connecticut Infantry Regiment but did not want to be a part of the war. Sullivan offered Van Hoesen $300 to take his place, which Van Hoesen agreed to do.

On October 24, 1863, Van Hoesen joined Company H of the 7th Connecticut Infantry under his new alias, James Sullivan. In April 1864, he was transferred to the Navy to serve aboard the gunboat USS Agawam. On December 2, 1864, he volunteered to take a gunpowder boat to Fort Fisher, North Carolina, and set it on fire. The explosion was not as successful as the Union hoped for, but the explosion did cause some fires to burn for a day or so. For this heroic action, he was awarded the Medal of Honor.

After his service in the war, Van Hoesen stopped using the alias James Sullivan, and tried to file for his veteran pension. He was denied his pension due to his desertion while he was in the Albany Barracks. He died on May 10, 1918, without ever getting his pension and without recognition for receiving the Medal of Honor, and was buried in Coeymans Hollow Cemetery in Albany, New York. His service in the Civil War was mentioned at his funeral, but nothing about his Medal of Honor. On August 27, 2016, ninety-eight years after he died, he was finally recognized as a Medal of Honor recipient by a new tombstone bearing the Medal of Honor marker.
