= Maurice O'Sullivan (disambiguation) =

Muiris Ó Súilleabháin (1904–1950), (anglicized as Maurice O'Sullivan) was an Irish writer.

Other notable people named Maurice O'Sullivan include:

- Maurice O'Sullivan (politician) (1892–1972), Australian politician
- Maurice J. O'Sullivan (born 1944), American historian
- Maurice O'Sullivan (boxer) (born 1952), British boxer

== See also ==
- Maurice Sullivan (disambiguation)
