= The Green Book (BBC) =

Booklet of guidelines

The BBC Variety Programmes Policy Guide For Writers and Producers, commonly referred to as The Green Book, is a booklet of guidelines issued by the British Broadcasting Corporation in 1949 to the producers and writers of its radio comedy programmes. It detailed what was then permissible as comedy material but its bureaucratic tone and outlandish strictures caused great amusement in the comedy world at the time. Most of its content is now completely out of date. It was a confidential document and was kept under lock and key. The executive responsible for its release was the then Head of Variety, Michael Standing, although it contained a large amount of material which had been previously issued in the preceding years in memo form.

The full text was first published with the BBC's permission in the book Laughter in the Air by Barry Took in 1976. It has since been sold by the BBC itself.

== Content ==
Among jokes banned were those concerning lavatories, effeminacy in men, immorality of any kind, suggestive references to honeymoon couples, chambermaids, fig-leaves, ladies' underwear (such as "winter draws on" and so on), lodgers and commercial travellers and the vulgar use of words such as "basket".

Caution had to be taken with jokes about drink, with not too many allowed to be made in any single programme. Also to be avoided were derogatory references to solicitors, miners and "the working class". Banned too was any reference to the McGillycuddy of the Reeks, or jokes about his name, in response to previous complaints.

The word "nigger" was banned although the phrase "Nigger Minstrels" was still tolerated. The document also advised: "Extreme care should be taken in dealing with references to or jokes about pre-natal influences (e.g. His mother was frightened by a donkey)."

== Later events ==
In January 1963 it was reported that the book was no longer being distributed, with a BBC spokesman being quoted by the Daily Telegraph as saying that the Corporation was "leaving it to the good taste of each individual producer." The paper reported that this brought the BBC's entertainment programmes in line with the popular satirical TV show That Was The Week That Was, which had never been subject to the book's regulations as it was a current affairs production and not an entertainment one. However, The Guardian quoted another BBC spokesman on the same day as denying the rules had been scrapped, but insisting that the book was "not distributed, however, to television programme producers for they are given the necessary guidance by the heads of departments."

The successor to the Green Book, the Producer Guidelines, the corporation's programme-making code of ethics was introduced by Deputy Director-General John Birt in 1989. This was comprehensively rewritten in 1993 largely by the BBC's Controller of Editorial Policy Richard Ayre who went on to become a BBC Trustee. The retitled BBC Editorial Guidelines are now on the seventh edition.
