= Timothy Sullivan (disambiguation) =

Timothy Sullivan ("Big Tim" Sullivan) (1862–1913) was a New York politician who controlled Manhattan's Bowery and Lower East Side districts.

Tim or Timothy Sullivan may also refer to:

== Arts and literature ==
- Tim Sullivan (writer) (1948–2024), American science fiction author
- Timothy Sullivan (composer) (born 1954), Canadian composer
- Tim Sullivan (British filmmaker) (born 1958), British film director and screenwriter
- Tim Sullivan (director) (born 1964), American film director and screenwriter

== Sports ==
- Ted Sullivan (baseball) (Timothy Sullivan, 1851–1929), Irish baseball player and manager
- Tim Sullivan (athlete) (born 1975), Australian Paralympic track and field athlete
- Tim Sullivan (sports columnist), American sports journalist

== Other ==
- Timothy Daniel Sullivan (1827–1914), Irish politician and poet
- Timothy Sullivan (Medal of Honor) (1835–1910), American Civil War sailor
- Timothy Sullivan (Irish judge) (1874–1949), Chief Justice of Ireland
- Timothy J. Sullivan (born 1944), American academic, President of the College of William and Mary
- Timothy S. Sullivan (fl. 1970s–2010s), United States Coast Guard rear admiral

== See also ==
- Timothy Sulivan (born 1946), British Army officer
