= Jim Sullivan (English footballer) =

English footballer (1904–1974)

Jimmy Sullivan
Personal information
- Full name: James Henry Sullivan
- Date of birth: 14 November 1904
- Place of birth: Burnley, England
- Date of death: May 1974 (aged 69)
- Place of death: Nottingham, England
- Height: 5 ft 8 1/2 in (1.74 m)
- Position: Centre forward

Senior career*
Years	Team	Apps	(Gls)
1922–1923	Burnley	0	(0)
1923–1924	Barrow	0	(0)
1924–1926	Crewe Alexandra	36	(22)
1926–1928	Notts County	22	(10)
Total		58	(32)
- * Club domestic league appearances and goals

James Henry Sullivan (14 November 1904 – May 1974) was an English professional association footballer who played as a centre forward.

As an amateur centre-forward Jimmy Sullivan scored 23 goals for Barrow Reserves, which led to him entering League football with Crewe Alexandra. In his first season at Gresty Road he scored 16 times in 26 Northern Section matches and had added a further six in 10 matches in the next season before joining Notts County in October 1925.

Throughout his time at Burnley, Barrow reserves and Crewe Alexandra Jimmy was training to be a teacher. He was in the final stages of his college course when he joined Notts County and upon qualifying took up a teaching post at Southwark Street School. At the time of his signing, Notts County had lost six of their first eleven engagements, winning only three. They were also the lowest scorers in Division One. The new centre-forward made an immediate impact, scoring twice against Sheffield United on his third appearance. One week later he netted a hat-trick against West Bromwich Albion at the Hawthorns to earn the Magpies a share of the points after they had been three goals down inside a quarter of an hour. Shortly afterwards, in a bruising encounter against Everton, he injured his collar-bone and shoulder ligaments and was out of action for several weeks. The Magpies were relegated from Division One in the same season. Sullivan had scored seven goals in nine matches and one is left with a feeling that the season's outcome might well have been different had their sharp-shooting schoolteacher steered clear of injury.

In his first season with Midland League Grantham Town Jimmy scored 44 goals, and averaged exactly a goal-a-game in 97 matches spread over just three seasons.
