= McGillycuddy of the Reeks =

One of the lines of hereditary chiefs of the name, Ireland

The McGillycuddy of the Reeks (Irish: Mac Giolla Mochuda) is the hereditary Chief of the Name of McGillycuddy, a family originating around MacGillycuddy's Reeks, a range of mountains (reeks) in County Kerry in Ireland.

== Origins of the title ==
The Annals of the Four Masters records in AD 234 the death of Prince Oilill Olum, King of Munster, the 43rd direct descendant of Milidh, or Milesius, who died in 1284 BC. Thus in legend, the line of the most distinguished families of Munster traces back over 3,300 years.

The McGillycuddys were a cadet sept of the O'Sullivans who about 1600 adopted the surname Mac Giolla Chuda, in recognition of their devotion to St Mochua. A seventh-century O'Sullivan Mór sent his trusted son, Mac Giolla, to be educated under the tutelage of Saint Mochuda at Lismore. He hence became known as O'Sullivan Mac Giolla Mochuda. The name was anglicised into McGillycuddy.

During the 19th century the McGillycuddy estate consisted of about 15,000 acres in County Kerry. The estate would eventually be handed over to its tenants after the passing of the 1923 land act.

== Recent chiefs ==
- Ross McGillycuddy (1882–1950), educated at Fettes College and RMA Woolwich, joined Royal Field Artillery, posted to India and earned his Jacket. Played rugby for RMA and for Kent County vs Springboks on their first tour in 1906. They played 28 matches, winning 25. He married Helen Grace Courage of Shenfield Place, Essex in 1908. He was a lieutenant colonel, 4/7th Royal Dragoon Guards (United Kingdom), witnessed the first action of the first world war on 23 August 1914 at Casteau, when a colleague was ordered to go after an Uhlan patrol with his sword, which he did with fatal consequences for the Uhlan. The sword is in the regimental museum at Tidworth. He was awarded a DSO and Légion d'honneur for improving the mobility of the Vickers machine gun. Brigadier de Lisle ordered him to form the first 36 companies of the Machine Gun Corps. He retired to Ireland on his father's death in 1921 and became a Kerry county councillor and member of Seanad Éireann (Irish Free State) throughout its existence (1922–1936) then of the modern Seanad from its 1938 revival until 1943. During World War II he was at the same time a senator, an officer in the British Army and Chief of the Name (the highest social rank of the Old Gaelic order). After Ross McGillycuddy complained to the BBC, its 1949 Green Book of standards entered the stricture 'Do not mention the McGillycuddy of the Reeks or make jokes about his name'.
- John Patrick McGillycuddy (1909–1959) was educated at Eton, and became a British Army Major. He was wounded in the Second World War, and a company director.
- Richard Denis Wyer McGillycuddy (1948–2004), lived in London and France. He was educated at Eton and Grenoble University. He married Virginia Astor and had two daughters but no son and heir.
- Donough McGillycuddy (born 1939) is the current Chief of the Name in Gaelic Royalty and Baron Doonebo. His father, Dermot, was a younger son of Ross McGillycuddy. Donough McGillycuddy was born in Bishopscourt, County Kildare, and was educated at Eton, and for a trimèstre at Neuchâtel University. He served in the Irish Guards (1958–1962), and married Wendy O'Connor Spencer of Winwick Manor in Northamptonshire. His tánaiste (heir) is his eldest son, Piers Donough Edward George McGillycuddy (born 1965), who established engineering firm Terracast with Erik van Ouwerkerk in 2004. He lives in Spain. His second son, Michael, lives in London, and his third, Jocelyn, in Johannesburg. His daughter Lavinia lives in Ireland. Donough was owner/manager of Warwickshire Pheasantries then the autonomous agent for Gilbertson and Page Ltd (petfood manufacturers and distributors). He moved to South Africa in 2002 to work as a farmer and horticulturalist for SPAR. His wife died in 2013 and he returned to Ireland in 2015 and joined the Benton Jones family at Irnham in 2017. Aged 83 in 2023, he looks after the Irnham herd of cattle, and helps on the land and garden for 'Irnham weddings'. He is a noted historian and author of two books on South Africa, SA Reflections on a revolution, and Mass murder on the Mine (Marikana).

== See also ==
Other Munster families:

- MacCarthy Mor
- O'Callaghan
- O'Donoghue
- O'Donovan
- O'Brien dynasty
- O'Grady of Kilballyowen
