= Maurice J. "Sully" Sullivan =

Maurice J. "Sully" Sullivan (October 1909 – February 28, 1998) was an immigrant from Ireland who moved to Hawaii and co-founded Foodland Super Markets with See Goo Lau, the largest and only locally owned supermarket chain in Hawaii. The first store opened on May 6, 1948 in Honolulu, Hawaii. By 2007, Foodland stores were found on each of the four largest Hawaiian Islands and had become the flagship of the Sullivan Family of Companies. "Sully" also famously introduced McDonald's to Hawaii in 1968 as well as Dunkin' Donuts. At one time, Forbes magazine ranked Sullivan among the nation's 400 wealthiest people with a net worth of over $150 million. Sullivan was succeeded by his daughter, Jenai S. Wall, as President of Foodland in 1995 and CEO in 1998, the year of his death.

As of 2012, heirs to Sullivan's fortune were listed as among Hawaii's Top 10 Richest People according to HawaiiBusiness magazine.
