= Patrick O'Sullivan (author) =

Irish-British scholar and author

- Education: Doctor of Philosophy from London School of Economics
- Occupations: Geographer, Writer, Academic
- Writing career
- Language: English
- Genres: Geography, Military geography, Strategic geography, Geopolitics
- Notable works: The Geography of Warfare, The Geography of War in the Post-Cold War World, Terrain and Tactics

Patrick O'Sullivan is an Irish-British scholar and author of works in the field of Military geography. His works include, The Geography of Warfare and The Geography of War in the Post-Cold War World.

In his book Geopolitics (1986), O'Sullivan makes a geographically-based case against the proliferation of nuclear weapons during the Cold War, arguing that nuclear weapons pose a threat primarily because they reduce the significance of both physical distance and national borders, which would otherwise function as deterrents to the likelihood of direct military engagement.

O'Sullivan has also written on the social scientific study of railway transportation in Britain as well as an autoethnographic Cultural Geography essay discussing the relevance of expatriate identity.

In 1994 he began teaching at Florida State University. He currently holds the status of professor emeritus. His academic writing focuses on regional geography and contains aspects of behavioral geography.

Patrick O'Sullivan passed away in 2026 in Tallahassee, Florida.
