= Joseph Sullivan (cricketer) =

English cricketer

Joseph Hubert Baron Sullivan (21 September 1890 – 8 February 1932) was an English amateur first-class cricketer, who played for one game for Yorkshire County Cricket Club in 1912, two for Cambridge University and one more for H. D. G. Leveson-Gower's XI in 1912. He also played four first-class games for the Europeans in India from 1921/22 to 1924/25.

Born in York, Sullivan was educated at St Peter's School, York, and Christ's College, Cambridge. He was a right-arm medium fast bowler, who took seven wickets at 27.71, with a best of 3 for 24 against the Indians. He scored 209 runs as a right-handed batsman, with a best of 44, also against the Indians. He took three catches in the field.

He died in February 1932 in Parkgate, Cheshire, aged 41. His brother, Arnold Sullivan, played thirteen games for Cambridge University and Sussex.
