= Gerry O'Sullivan (media) =

British television executive

Gerrard "Gerry" O'Sullivan (born 1964 in London) is a television executive, who has held a number of executive media roles at BSkyB, BBC, Fox News, ABC, Deutsche Telekom and Digicel TV. In 2009 The Telegraph described him as "one of the most influential Britons in technology" and in 2010 Wired named him a "TV pioneer" in their annual survey of the UK's top 100 digital power brokers.

== Career ==
O'Sullivan started his media career in 1985 as a broadcast engineer at the BBC. He became a senior studio and outside broadcast director of BBC Breakfast, BBC One O'Clock News, BBC Six O'Clock News, BBC Nine O'Clock News, Newsnight, and The Money Programme. He was the launch director of the BBC's first live virtual set programme: Working Lunch nominated for an RTS award.

In 1992, he moved to Sydney and was Head of Production for Australia's first 24-hour news channel TNC.

In 1995, he moved to New York to become CTO of WBIS.

In 1997, he moved to the newly established Fox News Channel as CTO.

In 2000 he moved back to the UK to work for BSKYB eventually being promoted to Director of Strategic Product Development.

In 2010 he was asked to lead Deutsche Telekom TV and OTT digital media business with over five million IPTV subscribers.

In 2014 -15, as Interim CEO for Digicel's TV group, he launched a number of next generation cloud based IPTV and quad play services throughout the Caribbean, South America and the Pacific.

In 2017, O'Sullivan was asked to join the board of directors for Piksel, a cloud based video services company.

In 2018, O'Sullivan joined Eutelsat as Executive Vice President, Global TV and Video.

In 2021, O'Sullivan joined FIFA as Director, Digital Product Development.

== Achievements ==
At BSKYB he was responsible for the strategy and execution of the companies innovation launching Sky+HD, Sky Broadband and Sky 3D.

On 22 May 2006 Sky+ HD was launched, the UK's first HDTV service.

On 27 March 2007, Sky launched its Sky Anytime on TV Push-Video on Demand service.

In 2008 O'Sullivan's team first demonstrated the ability to produce and broadcast 3DTV in the UK, culminating two years later with the world's first football match broadcast in 3D. The first programme that was broadcast by Sky in 3D was the Arsenal vs Manchester United football match on Sunday 31 January 2010. The 3D match was available in nine hand-picked pubs in England and in Ireland. Sky launched its 3D services on 3 April with the Manchester United vs Chelsea football match being broadcast in over a thousand pubs across England in 3D.

On 30 July 2009, Sky confirmed the launch of a full online video-on-demand (VOD) service one of the earliest video OTT services.

On 29 April 2010, Sky launched their video-on-demand service, Sky Anytime+

In 2018, Eutelsat launched a global video OTT service "Cirrus" Eutelsat Cirrus

In 2019, Eutelsat launched the world's first 8K broadcast channel 8k Launch

In 2022, FIFA launched a global OTT streaming platform for the World Cup FIFA + Launch

== Personal life ==
He lives in West London with his wife and two children.
