= Harry Sullivan (baseball) =

American baseball player (1888–1919)

- Pitcher
- Born: April 22, 1888; Rockford, Illinois
- Died: September 22, 1919 (aged 31); Rockford, Illinois
- Batted: Left Threw: Left

MLB debut
- August 11, 1909, for the St. Louis Cardinals

Last MLB appearance
- September 23, 1909, for the St. Louis Cardinals

MLB statistics
- Win–loss record: 0–0
- Earned run average: 36.00
- Strikeouts: 2
- Stats at Baseball Reference

Teams
- St. Louis Cardinals (1909)

Harry Andrew Sullivan (April 22, 1888 – September 22, 1919) was a pitcher in Major League Baseball who played for the St. Louis Cardinals during the 1909 season. He batted and threw left-handed.

Born in Rockford, Illinois, Sullivan attended Saint Louis University. He joined the Cardinals late in the season, appearing for them in two games, including one start. He allowed six runs (four earned) on four hits and two walks for a 36.00 ERA. He did not strike out a single batter in one inning of work and did not have a decision.

Sullivan died in Rockford, Illinois, at the age of 31.

== Sources ==
- Career statistics from Baseball Reference · Retrosheet · Baseball Almanac
