= William Graham-Toler, 4th Earl of Norbury =

Irish peer

The Right Honourable The Earl of Norbury DL JP
- Born: William Brabazon Lindsay Graham-Toler; 2 July 1862
- Died: 20 April 1943 (aged 80)
- Education: Harrow School
- Alma mater: Christ Church, Oxford
- Spouse: Lucy Ellis (m. 1908, died)
- Parent(s): Hector Graham-Toler, 3rd Earl of Norbury; Lady Steuart Bethune
- Relatives: Sir Henry Bethune, 1st Baronet (grandfather); Hector Graham-Toler, 2nd Earl of Norbury (grandfather); Eric Alexander, 5th Earl of Caledon (cousin); Harold Alexander, 1st Earl Alexander of Tunis (cousin)

William Brabazon Lindsay Graham-Toler, 4th Earl of Norbury (2 July 1862 – 20 April 1943), styled Viscount Glandine from 1862 to 1873, was an Irish peer.

== Early life ==
William Brabazon Lindsay Graham-Toler was born on 2 July 1862. He was the second, but only surviving, son of Hector Graham-Toler, 3rd Earl of Norbury and Lady Steuart Bethune. Among his siblings were Lady Mary Catherine Graham-Toler (who married their cousin, Sir Charles John Stewart), Lady Elizabeth Graham-Toler (who married James Alexander, 4th Earl of Caledon), Lady Margaret Albinia Grace Graham-Toler (who married barrister Edward Boycott Jenkins), Lady Charlotte Emily Alexina Graham-Toler (who never married). His elder twin brother, Hon. Hector Graham-Toler, died in infancy.

His paternal grandparents were Elizabeth Brabazon (a daughter of William Brabazon of Brabazon Park, County Meath; brother to Sir Anthony Brabazon, 1st Baronet) and Hector Graham-Toler, 2nd Earl of Norbury (who was murdered at the family home, Durrow Abbey in Tullamore). The Toler family was originally from Norfolk but settled in County Tipperary in the 17th century. The Toler family was originally from Norfolk, but settled in Ireland during the reign of Charles I, when an ancestor who was a successful soldier in Cronwell's army obtained a grant of lands in County Tipperary and settled at Beechwood. His maternal grandparents were Gen. Sir Henry Bethune, 1st Baronet (de jure 9th Earl of Lindsay) and Coutts Trotter (a daughter of John Trotter of Dyrham Park, Hertfordshire who was named after her uncle Sir Coutts Trotter, 1st Baronet).

== Career ==
He was educated at Harrow School and Christ Church, Oxford. Upon the death of his father on 26 December 1873, he succeeded as the 4th Earl of Norbury and 4th Viscount Glandine, of Glandine, King's County, as well as the 5th Baron Norwood of Knockalton, County Tipperary, and 5th Baron Norbury of Ballycrenode, County Tipperary, all in the Peerage of Ireland.

In 1898, he was caught up in the examination of bankrupt company promoter, Ernest Terah Hooley, and Lord Norbury, along with the 8th Earl De La Warr and others, had to submit sworn statements that they never received bribes from Hooley. Norbury denied "that he received £1,000 ($5,000) to join the Singer Board."

In 1915, during World War I, Lord Norbury "obtained a job as fitter in a factory in Surrey to be used by a big firm of armament manufacturers for the construction of aeroplanes."

== Personal life ==
On 28 July 1908, Lord Norbury married Lucy Henrietta Katherine Ellis, daughter of Rev. Hon. William Charles Ellis (younger son of the 6th Baron Howard de Walden) and Henrietta Elizabeth Ames (a daughter of Henry Metcalfe Ames). They lived at Carlton Park, Market Harborough, Leicestershire.

Lord Norbury died on 20 April 1943. As he had no male issue, he was succeeded in his titles by his distant cousin, Ronald Ian Montagu Graham-Toler. His widow, the dowager Lady Norbury, died on 5 March 1904.

Peerage of Ireland
Preceded by Hector John Graham-Toler	Earl of Norbury; 1873–1943	Succeeded by Ronald Ian Montagu Graham-Toler
