= Hector Graham-Toler, 3rd Earl of Norbury =

Irish peer

The Right Honourable The Earl of Norbury DL JP

High Sheriff of King's County
- In office 1835–1835
- Preceded by: John Tibeaudo
- Succeeded by: Sir Michael Cusac-Smith

Personal details
- Born: Hector John Toler; 17 September 1810
- Died: 26 December 1873 (aged 63)
- Spouse: Lady Steuart Bethune (m. 1848; died 1873)
- Relations: John Toler, 1st Earl of Norbury (grandfather); Grace Toler, 1st Baroness Norwood (grandmother); Eric Alexander, 5th Earl of Caledon (grandson); Harold Alexander, 1st Earl Alexander of Tunis (grandson)
- Children: 6, including William
- Education: Eton College
- Alma mater: Christ Church, Oxford

Hector John Graham-Toler, 3rd Earl of Norbury DL JP (17 September 1810 – 26 December 1873), styled Viscount Glandine from 1831 to 1839, was an Irish peer.

== Early life ==
Hector John Toler was born on 17 September 1810. He was the eldest surviving son of the former Elizabeth Brabazon and Hector Graham-Toler, 2nd Earl of Norbury, who was murdered at the family home, Durrow Abbey in Tullamore in 1839. Among his siblings were Lady Elizabeth Graham-Toler (who married Hon. Laurence Parsons, son of the 2nd Earl of Rosse), Lady Grace Graham-Toler (who married Col. Crofton Moore Vandeleur), Lady Helen Graham-Toler (who married John Vandeleur Stewart, son of Alexander Stewart), Lady Georgina Graham-Toler (who married John Gurdon Rebow), Hon. Otway Fortescue Graham-Toler (who married Hon. Henrietta Elizabeth Scarlett, a daughter of the 2nd Baron Abinger), Lady Charlotte Sarah Graham-Toler (who married the 4th Baron Braybrooke and, after his death, Dr. Frederic Hetley), and Lady Isabella Rebecca Graham-Toler (who married Alexander John Robert Stewart, son of Alexander Robert Stewart).

His paternal grandparents were He was the son of John Toler, 1st Earl of Norbury and Grace Graham, suo jure 1st Baroness Norwood of Knockalton (a daughter of Hector Graham, an official in the Court of Common Pleas). The Toler family was originally from Norfolk but settled in County Tipperary in the 17th century. The Toler family was originally from Norfolk, but settled in Ireland during the reign of Charles I, when an ancestor who was a successful soldier in Cronwell's army obtained a grant of lands in County Tipperary and settled at Beechwood. His maternal grandparents were William Brabazon of Brabazon Park, County Meath (brother to Sir Anthony Brabazon, 1st Baronet), and Elizabeth (née Phibbs) Brabazon (daughter and heiress of John Phibbs, of Lisconny).

He was educated at Eton College and Christ Church, Oxford.

== Career ==
On 26 November 1825, along with his father and siblings, his surname was legally changed to Graham-Toler by Royal Licence. Upon the death of his father on 3 January 1839, he succeeded as the 3rd Earl of Norbury and 3rd Viscount Glandine, of Glandine, King's County, as well as the 4th Baron Norwood of Knockalton, County Tipperary, and 4th Baron Norbury of Ballycrenode, County Tipperary, all in the Peerage of Ireland.

He served as High Sheriff of King's County in 1835 and as Deputy Lieutenant of King's County, and magistrate for County Cork.

== Personal life ==
On 7 November 1848, Lord Norbury married Lady Steuart Bethune, daughter of Gen. Sir Henry Bethune, 1st Baronet (de jure 9th Earl of Lindsay) and Coutts Trotter (a daughter of John Trotter of Dyrham Park, Hertfordshire who was named after her uncle Sir Coutts Trotter, 1st Baronet). Together, they were the parents of four daughters and two sons, including:

- Lady Mary Catherine Graham-Toler (1855–1930), who married her cousin, Sir Charles John Stewart, son of John Vandeleur Stewart and Lady Helen Graham-Toler, in 1884.
- Lady Elizabeth Graham-Toler (1857–1939), who married James Alexander, 4th Earl of Caledon, son of James Alexander, 3rd Earl of Caledon and Lady Jane Grimston (a daughter of the 1st Earl of Verulam), in 1884.
- Lady Margaret Albinia Grace Graham-Toler (1858–1926), who married barrister Edward Boycott Jenkins, son of Edward Jenkins and Jane Crawford Jenkins (who later married the 1st Earl of Lovelace), in 1880.
- Lady Charlotte Emily Alexina Graham-Toler (1860–1932), who never married.
- Hon. Hector Graham-Toler (1862–1862), a twin who died in infancy.
- William Brabazon Lindsay Graham-Toler, 4th Earl of Norbury (1862–1943), a twin; he married Lucy Henrietta Katherine Ellis, daughter of Rev. Hon. William Charles Ellis (younger son of the 6th Baron Howard de Walden) and Henrietta Elizabeth Ames, in 1908.

Lord Norbury died on 26 December 1873. He was succeeded in his titles by his only son, William. His widow, the dowager Lady Norbury, died on 5 March 1904.

Peerage of Ireland
Preceded by Hector John Graham-Toler	Earl of Norbury; 1839–1873	Succeeded by William Brabazon Lindsay Graham-Toler
