= Boyle Roche =

Irish politician (1736–1807)

Sir Boyle Roche Bt

Member, Irish House of Commons
- In office 1775–1801
- Preceded by: James Agar
- Constituency: Tralee; Gowran; Portarlington; Old Leighlin

Personal details
- Born: October 1736 County Galway
- Died: 5 June 1807 Dublin
- Spouse: Mary Frankland

Sir Boyle Roche, 1st Baronet (October 1736 – 5 June 1807) was an Irish politician. After a distinguished career in North America with the British Army, Roche became a member of the Irish House of Commons in 1775, generally acting in support of the viceregal government. He is better remembered for the language of his speeches than for his politics – they were riddled with mixed metaphors ("Mr Speaker, I smell a rat; I see him forming in the air and darkening the sky; but I'll nip him in the bud"), malapropisms and other unfortunate turns of phrase ("Why we should put ourselves out of our way to do anything for posterity, for what has posterity ever done for us?"). Roche may have been Richard Brinsley Sheridan's model for Mrs Malaprop. While arguing for a bill, Roche once said, "It would surely be better, Mr. Speaker, to give up not only a part, but, if necessary, even the whole, of our constitution, to preserve the remainder!"

While these Irish bulls have led many writers to portray Roche as a buffoon, other biographers have interpreted them not as blunders, but as calculated attempts to disarm opposition to ministerial policies through humour. Roche ended his political career with the passage of the Act of Union 1800, which he supported. He chose not to attempt to enter the British House of Commons and retired on a government pension until his death, married but childless, in 1807.

== Life ==
=== Early life, family background and military service ===
Boyle Roche was born, the youngest of three sons, to Jordan Roche and Ellen White in County Galway in 1736. His was an old and respectable Protestant family, said to be a junior branch of the ancient baronial house of Roche, Viscount Fermoy from which Diana, Princess of Wales, descended. The family were also no strangers to politics: Roche's great-grandfather had been elected mayor of Limerick four times. Roche's older brother was Tiger Roche, a celebrated duellist and adventurer.

Boyle Roche entered the army at an early age, and served in the so-called American war (that is, the American portion of the Seven Years' War). There are reports of a Lieutenant Boyle Roche in Rogers' Rangers who was captured by the French during The Battle on Snowshoes (near what is now Lake George, New York in March 1758) and later returned to his regiment. It is possible that Roche served with Wolfe at the Siege of Quebec in 1759; it is a certainty that he distinguished himself in 1762 during the capture of El Morro in Havana. By 1770 he had become a major in the 28th Foot. He was knighted for his bravery at El Morro in 1776.

Retiring from the army, he obtained an office in the Irish revenue department in 1775. In the same year, Boyle Roche entered the Irish House of Commons as Member of Parliament (MP) for Tralee, a seat he held until 1776.

Although he was one of the first volunteers to fight the rebellious colonials in 1776, his contribution to that conflict was mainly in the area of recruitment—he successfully enlisted 500 volunteers in one weekend in Limerick alone, a feat which so gratified Lord Kenmare that he paid Roche an additional bounty of half a guinea per man. Roche's flamboyant recruiting methods were described by the Edinburgh Advertiser as follows:

Yesterday Major BOYLE Roche, representative in parliament for Tralee (who is raising a body of men for his Majesty's service) began recruiting here, and met with great success, which is not surprising, if we consider his connexions, and the uncommon support he has received from the noblemen and gentlemen of this province. His method of enlisting was as uncommon as it was pleasing to those who viewed the procession, which was as follows: Major Roche, bearing a large purse of gold. Captain Cowley. A great number of likely recruits. An elegant band of music, consisting of French horns, hautboys [oboes], clarionets, and bassoons, playing God Save the King. A large brewer's dray, with five-barrels of beer, the horse richly caparisoned and ornamented with ribbands. Two draymen with cockades to serve the beer, The recruiting serjeant. Drums [and] fifes. Another division of recruits. The returning soldiers. Prodigious concourse of [spectators?]. The following speech was made by Major Roche to the populace: Being appointed, through the favour of [our] most excellent governor, to raise a body of men for the service of his Majesty, I think it [a] most happy circumstance of my life to be the instrument of leading you to honour and renown. The laurels fought for and obtained in all parts [of] the globe [through] war, have procured us a fame so glorious as not to be equalled by people in any fame not to be sullied by the assaults of prejudice, nor the effects of time: not an action in which we were not victorious, not a siege in which we were not honoured. Will you, my dear countrymen, permit those laurels to fade, or those actions to be forgotten? No, forbid it, heaven! Let us now that we have it in our power convey to later posterity a renewal of our fidelity, and a confirmation of our loyalty. A more critical period never presented itself, nor had we ever a fairer opportunity of shewing our attachment to the illustrious house of Hanover, than the present, as his Majesty's deluded subjects in America are in open rebellion, and like unnatural children, wound their ever indulgent parent, forgetting the torrents of blood spilt, and heap of treasure expended for their preservation. His Sacred Majesty now calls and our fidelity obliges us, and I hope your instinct prompts you, to obey the dictates of so [grand] a master. Let us then, my brave and loyal countrymen, join hearts and hands and cheerfully step forth in the glorious cause of our Creator, our King and our Country.

In Dublin, Roche was a member of the Kildare Street Club.

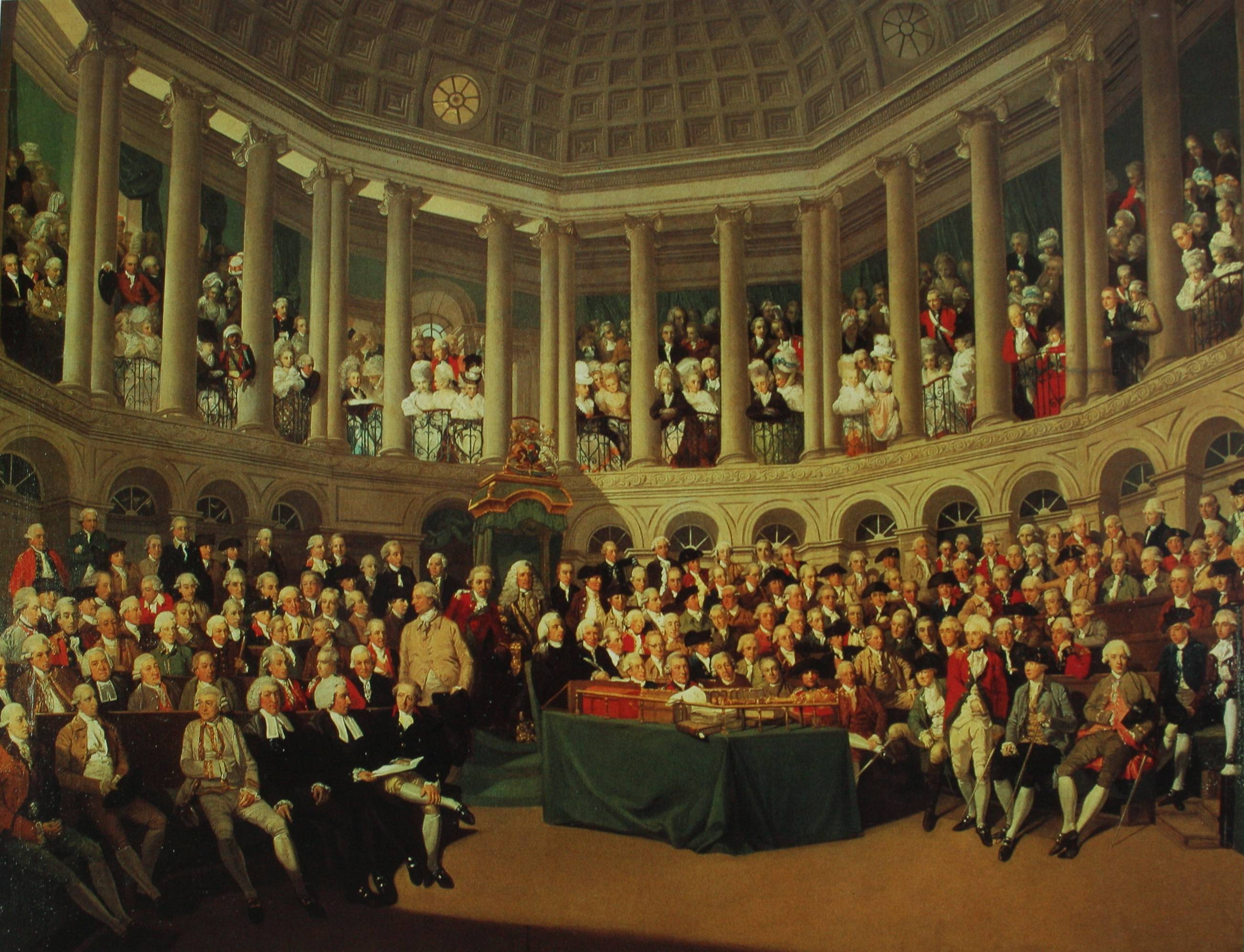
The Irish House of Commons by Francis Wheatley (1780)

=== Member of Parliament ===
Roche continued on in the Grattan Parliament, representing Gowran from 1777 to 1783, Portarlington from 1784 to 1790, Tralee (again) from 1790 to 1798 and Old Leighlin from 1798 until the union with Great Britain in 1801. From the beginning of his parliamentary career Roche ranged himself on the side of the government, and for his services he was granted a pension, appointed chamberlain to the viceregal court, and on 30 November 1782 was created a baronet. For the office of chamberlain he was thought to be "eminently qualified by his handsome figure, graceful address and ready wit, qualities which were set off by a frank, open and manly disposition."

It was during this period (in 1782) that Roche coined the term "Protestant Ascendancy".

Apparently, members of the cabinet wrote speeches for Sir Boyle which he somewhat imperfectly committed to memory, in general mastering the substance but frequently producing, through his love of language and ornament, travesties on the original words. Through this he gained his lasting reputation as an inveterate perpetrator of Irish bulls.

Boyle's memory was indeed excellent. On one occasion he illustrated both the accuracy of his memory and the audacity of his character at the expense of a brother member. Edmond Stanley, anxious to produce an effect in an important debate, had been at pains to reduce his speech to writing. Unluckily, Stanley happened to drop his manuscript in the coffee-room, and walked back into the House unconscious of his loss. Sir Boyle, finding the document, speedily mastered its contents, and, rising at the first opportunity, delivered the speech almost verbatim in the hearing of its dismayed and astonished author. His apology afterward only added insult to injury:

Here, my dear Stanley, is your speech again, and I thank you kindly for the loan of it. I never was so much at a loss for a speech in the whole course of my life, and sure it is not a pin the worse for the wear.

On another occasion, he amused and relieved the House, irritated by the prospect of being obliged to listen to the reading of a mass of documents as a preliminary to a resolution, by suggesting that a dozen or so clerks be called in who might read the documents simultaneously and thus dispose of the business in a few minutes.

Beyond these efforts, he was also the author of a bill to enact, among other things, that "Every quart bottle should contain a quart."

=== The Volunteer Convention ===
The chief service Boyle Roche rendered his government was in connection with the Volunteer Convention of November 1783, in which he "acted a part only less remarkable than his immunity from the opprobrium which might have been expected to attach to it." The question of admitting the Roman Catholics to the franchise was at the time being agitated, and found many warm supporters in the convention. The proposal was extremely obnoxious to the Irish government, and on the second day of the meeting the secretary of state, George Ogle, announced that the Roman Catholics, in the person of Lord Kenmare, had relinquished the idea of making any claim further than the religious liberty they then enjoyed, and gave as his authority for this extraordinary statement Sir Boyle Roche, by whom it was confirmed!

Ten days later Lord Kenmare (who had not been in Dublin at the time) denied that he had given the least authority to any person to make any such statement in his name. However, his disavowal came too late: the anti-Catholic party in the convention had found time to organize themselves, and when the intended Reform Bill took shape it was known that the admission of Roman Catholics to the franchise was not to form part of the scheme.

Several months later (on Valentine's Day), Sir Boyle explained himself in a public letter, starting with a description of his alarm upon hearing that the bishop of Derry (then Frederick Hervey) and his associates were bent on extending the legislative privilege:

I thought a crisis was arrived in which Lord Kenmare and the heads of that body should step forth to disavow those wilde projects, and to profess their attachment to the lawful powers. Unfortunately, his lordship was at a great distance, and most of my other friends were out of the way. I therefore resolved on a bold stroke, and authorized only by the sentiments of the persons in question, [took action].

He added that while he regretted that his message had been disowned by Lord Kenmare, that was of less consequence, since his manoeuvre had succeeded to admiration. Some believe that Sir Boyle, who was related to Lord Kenmare and often represented his views in Commons, was also stating Lord Kenmare's true views on this occasion and doing so with his full knowledge, but in a way that provided Kenmare plausible deniability.

Sir Boyle fought hard for the Union:

Gentlemen may tither, and tither, and tither, and may think it a bad measure; but their heads at present are hot, and will so remain till they grow cool again, and so they can't decide right now, but when the day of judgement comes then honourable gentlemen will be satisfied with this most excellent union.

For himself, he declared that his love for England and Ireland was so great that he "would have the two sisters embrace like one brother."

=== His life in politics ===
Those who placidly accept the judgement that Boyle Roche was "the Fool of the Grattan Parliament" should reflect on the fact that for almost 25 years he served as Gentleman Usher and Master of Ceremonies to the Irish Court, "an office for which a dignified and decorous demeanor is among the chief essentials."

Roche was also capable of humour which was both subtle and unquestionably intentional. Once, upon hearing his opponent John Philpot Curran expostulate that he could be "the guardian of his own honour", Sir Boyle offered his "congratulations to the honourable member on his possession of a sinecure." On another occasion, when the Opposition tried to cough him down in a debate, Sir Boyle met the interruption by producing some bullets, with the observation "I have here some excellent pills to cure a cough." His personal courage being beyond dispute, this jest was quite sufficient in those duelling days to procure attention for the remainder of his speech.

=== Marriage, retirement and death ===
Mary, Lady Roche by Gilbert Stuart (ca. 1790)

On 20 October 1778, Boyle Roche married Mary Frankland of Great Thirkleby Hall, near Thirsk, Yorkshire, daughter of Admiral Sir Thomas Frankland, Bt, whose family name goes back to the time of William the Conqueror. Although childless, Boyle and Lady Mary appeared to have lived a life of uninterrupted happiness.

After the Union and the dissolution of the Irish Parliament, Boyle received a £400 pension, and in addition £300 annually in his capacity as "Surveyor of Kenmare River," a post which had been invented as a reward and required no work. Thus provided for, he was able to spend the rest of his days in comfort.

Boyle Roche died at his house in 63 Eccles Street, Dublin, on 5 June 1807, and was buried in St. Mary's Church, Dublin, on 9 June. Mary lived on until 1831.

== Boyle Roche's bird ==
Roche is perhaps best known for once excusing an absence in Parliament thus: "Mr. Speaker, it is impossible I could have been in two places at once, unless I were a bird." This quotation was referenced by Ambrose Bierce in The Devil's Dictionary in his definition of ubiquity:

In recent times ubiquity has not always been understood—not even by Sir Boyle Roche, for example, who held that a man cannot be in two places at once unless he is a bird.

But Roche was not uttering a malapropism here, he was quoting, and quoting correctly. The line appears in Jevon's play, The Devil of a Wife, as follows:

Wife: I cannot be in two places at once.

Husband (Rowland): Surely no, unless thou wert a bird.

== Footnotes ==
Parliament of Ireland
Preceded by Edward Denny; Richard Underwood	Member of Parliament for Tralee; 1775–1776; With: Edward Denny	Succeeded by John Crosbie, Viscount Crosbie; John Toler
Preceded by James Agar; John Butler	Member of Parliament for Gowran; 1777–1783; With: John Butler	Succeeded by Hon. Henry Welbore Agar; George Dunbar
Preceded by John Scott; Thomas Kelly	Member of Parliament for Portarlington; 1784–1790; With: Robert Hobart	Succeeded by Richard Cavendish; William Browne
Preceded by Sir William Godfrey, 1st Bt; James Carique-Ponsonby	Member of Parliament for Tralee; 1790–1798; With: Crosbie Morgell 1790–1795; William Fletcher 1795–1798	Succeeded by Maurice FitzGerald; James Crosbie
Preceded by Edward Cooke; Patrick Duigenan	Member of Parliament for Old Leighlin; 1798–1801; With: Edward Cooke	Succeeded by Parliament of the United Kingdom
Baronetage of Ireland
New creation	Baronet (of Fermoy); 1782–1807	Extinct
