= Knockalton =

Knockalton may refer to the following places in the Republic of Ireland:

- Knockalton Lower
- Knockalton Upper
