= Earl of Norbury =

Title in the peerage of Ireland

Earldom of Norbury
- Arms: Quarterly: 1st & 4th, Argent, a Cross-fleury Gules, charged with a plain Cross couped Argent, between four Oak-Leaves slipped proper (Toler); 2nd & 3rd, Argent, a Trefoil slipped Vert, on a Chief Sable, three Escallops Or (Graham). Crest: On a Ducal Coronet a Fleur-de-lis Or. Supporters: Dexter: A Horse Or, bridled Gules; Sinister: A Fawn proper.
- Creation date: 23 January 1827
- Created by: George IV
- Peerage: Peerage of Ireland
- First holder: John Toler, 1st Baron Norbury
- Present holder: Richard Graham-Toler, 7th Earl of Norbury
- Subsidiary titles: Viscount Glandine; Baron Norwood; Baron Norbury
- Status: Extant
- Motto: REGI ET PATRIÆ FIDELIS (Faithful to King and country)

Earl of Norbury, in the County of Tipperary, is a title in the Peerage of Ireland. It was created in 1827, along with the title Viscount Glandine, of Glandine in the King's County, for the Irish politician and judge John Toler, 1st Baron Norbury, upon his retirement as Chief Justice of the Common Pleas in Ireland. The titles were created with special remainder to his second son, Hector, as his eldest son, Daniel, was then considered mentally unwell. Lord Norbury had already been created Baron Norbury, of Ballycrenode in the County of Tipperary, in the Peerage of Ireland in 1800, with remainder to the heirs male of his body. Moreover, his wife, Grace Toler (née Graham), had been created Baroness Norwood, of Knockalton in the County of Tipperary, in the Peerage of Ireland in 1797, with remainder to the heirs male of her body. By the time Lord Norbury was raised to the Earldom, his wife had died and their eldest son had succeeded her as 2nd Baron Norwood. This son also succeeded Lord Norbury himself on his death in 1831 as 2nd Baron Norbury, whilst his younger brother Daniel succeeded to the viscountcy and earldom according to the special remainder. In 1832, the second Earl also succeeded his elder brother in the two baronies. He had already in 1825 assumed the additional surname of Graham by Royal licence. He was shot "by an assassin, in his own plantation" at Durrow Abbey, County Offaly in 1839.

== Earls of Norbury (1827) ==
- John Toler, 1st Earl of Norbury (1745–1831)
- Hector John Graham-Toler, 2nd Earl of Norbury (1781–1839)
- Hector John Graham-Toler, 3rd Earl of Norbury (1810–1873)
- William Brabazon Lindsay Graham-Toler, 4th Earl of Norbury (1862–1943)
- Ronald Ian Montagu Graham-Toler, 5th Earl of Norbury (1893–1955)
- Noel Terence Graham-Toler, 6th Earl of Norbury (1939–2000)
- Richard James Graham-Toler, 7th Earl of Norbury (born 1967)

== Present peer ==
Richard James Graham-Toler, 7th Earl of Norbury (born 5 March 1967) is the only son of the 6th Earl and his wife Rosamund Margaret Anne Mathew. On 11 September 2000 he succeeded as Earl of Norbury, Baron Norwood, Baron Norbury, and Viscount Glandine, all in the peerage of Ireland.

Norbury has a sister, Lady Patricia Margaret Graham-Toler (born 1970). As of 2003, there was no heir to the peerages.

== Barons Norbury (1800) ==
- John Toler, 1st Earl of Norbury, 1st Baron Norbury (1745–1831)
- Daniel Toler, 2nd Baron Norwood and 2nd Baron Norbury (1781–1832)
- Hector John Graham-Toler, 2nd Earl of Norbury, 3rd Baron Norbury (1781–1839)

== Barons Norwood (1797) ==
- Grace Toler, 1st Baroness Norwood (died 1822)
- Daniel Toler, 2nd Baron Norwood and 2nd Baron Norbury (c. 1780–1832)
- Hector John Graham-Toler, 2nd Earl of Norbury, 3rd Baron Norwood (1781–1839)
