= Stephen Ram =

Stephen Ram may refer to:

- Stephen Ram (died 1746), MP for Gorey and Duleek (Parliament of Ireland constituency)
- Stephen Ram (1744–1821), MP for Duleek and Gorey (Parliament of Ireland constituency)
