= Barry Denny =

Barry Denny may refer to:

- Barry Denny (footballer) (born 1953), Australian rules footballer
- Sir Barry Denny, 1st Baronet (c. 1744–1794), Anglo-Irish politician
- Sir Barry Denny, 2nd Baronet (died 1794), Anglo-Irish politician
- Barry Denny (Tralee MP), Irish politician

== See also ==
- Denny Barry (1883–1923), Irish Republican who died during a hunger strike
- Denny (surname)
