= John Toler, 1st Earl of Norbury =

Irish judge and politician

The Right Honourable The Earl of Norbury PC KC
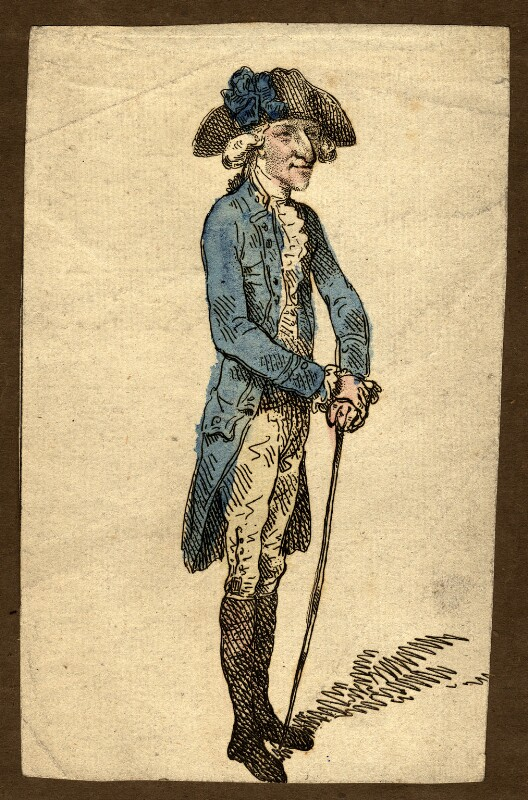

Chief Justice of the Irish Common Pleas
- In office 1800–1827
- Monarchs: George III; George IV
- Preceded by: The Viscount Carleton
- Succeeded by: William Plunket, 1st Baron Plunket

Personal details
- Born: 3 December 1745 Beechwood, County Tipperary
- Died: 27 July 1831 Great Denmark Street, Dublin
- Spouse: Grace Graham (died 1827)
- Education: Trinity College Dublin

John Toler, 1st Earl of Norbury PC, KC (3 December 1745 – 27 July 1831), known as The Lord Norbury between 1800 and 1827, was an Irish lawyer, politician and judge. A greatly controversial figure in his time, he was nicknamed the "Hanging Judge" and was considered to be one of the most corrupt legal figures in Irish history. He was Chief Justice of the Irish Common Pleas between 1800 and 1827.

== Background and education ==
Born at Beechwood, Nenagh, County Tipperary, Norbury was the youngest son of Daniel Toler, M.P., and Letitia, daughter of Thomas Otway (1665–1724), of Lissenhall, Nenagh, County Tipperary. His elder brother Daniel Toler was also a politician, serving as High Sheriff for Tipperary and also as M.P. for Tipperary. The Toler family was originally from Norfolk but settled in County Tipperary in the 17th century. He was educated at Kilkenny College and at Trinity College Dublin. He lived at Cabragh House on the corner of the present day Fassaugh Avenue and Rathoath Road in Cabra, Dublin. He also had a townhouse at No 3 Great Denmark Street, Dublin. He had a country house and estate at Durrow Abbey, County Offaly.

== Political and legal career, 1770–1800 ==
After graduating from university Norbury entered the legal profession and was called to the Irish Bar in 1770. In 1781 he was appointed a King's Counsel. Norbury was returned to the Irish Parliament for Tralee in 1773, a seat he held until 1780, and later represented Philipstown between 1783 and 1790 and Gorey from 1790 until the Act of Union in 1801. In 1789 he was appointed Solicitor-General for Ireland, which he remained until 1798 when he was promoted to Attorney-General for Ireland and sworn of the Irish Privy Council. In his role as Attorney-General he was responsible for the prosecution of those involved in the Irish Rebellion of 1798. According to The Dictionary of National Biography "his indifference to human suffering … disgusted even those who thought the occasion called for firmness on the part of government". In 1799, he brought forward a law which gave the Lord Lieutenant of Ireland power to suspend the Habeas Corpus Act and to impose martial law.

== Chief Justice of the Irish Common Pleas, 1800–1827 ==
In 1800 he was appointed Chief Justice of the Irish Common Pleas and raised to the Peerage of Ireland as Baron Norbury, of Ballycrenode in the County of Tipperary. His appointment to the bench was controversial and Lord Clare, the Lord Chancellor of Ireland, is said to have quipped: "'Make him a bishop, or even an archbishop, but not a chief justice'". Norbury's tenure as Chief Justice lasted for twenty-seven years, despite the fact that, the Dictionary of National Biography opines, "his scanty knowledge of the law, his gross partiality, his callousness, and his buffoonery, completely disqualified him for the position. His court was in constant uproar owing to his noisy merriment. He joked even when the life of a human being was hanging in the balance." This earned him the nickname the "Hanging Judge". It has been said of him that he was "generally regarded as Ireland's most notorious judge with a penchant for hanging that ran even the infamous Judge Jeffreys close." His most famous trial was that of Irish Republican leader Robert Emmet. Norbury interrupted and abused Emmet throughout the trial before sentencing him to death. In spite of this, with his strong belief in the Protestant ascendancy, he is considered to have had great influence over the government in Ireland in the early part of the nineteenth century.

However, Norbury's position eventually became untenable even to his strongest supporters, especially with the British government's aim of establishing a better relationship with the Catholic majority. His reputation was tainted in 1822, when a letter written to him by William Saurin, the Attorney-General for Ireland, was discovered, in which Saurin urged Norbury to use his influence with the Irish Protestant gentry which made up local juries against the Catholics (Saurin was dismissed soon afterwards). He found his greatest adversary in Daniel O'Connell, to whom Norbury was "an especial object of abhorrence". At O'Connell's instigation the case of Saurin's letter was brought before the British Parliament by Henry Brougham. Norbury survived this as well as an 1825 petition drawn up by O'Connell, which called for his removal on the grounds of him falling asleep during a murder trial and later being unable to present any account of the evidence given. However, it was not until George Canning became Prime Minister in 1827 that Norbury, then in his eighty-second year, was finally induced to resign. His resignation was sweetened by him being created Viscount Glandine and Earl of Norbury, of Glandine in King's County, in the Peerage of Ireland. Unlike the barony of Norbury these titles were created with remainder to his second son Hector John (his eldest son Daniel was then considered mentally unsound).

== Personal life ==
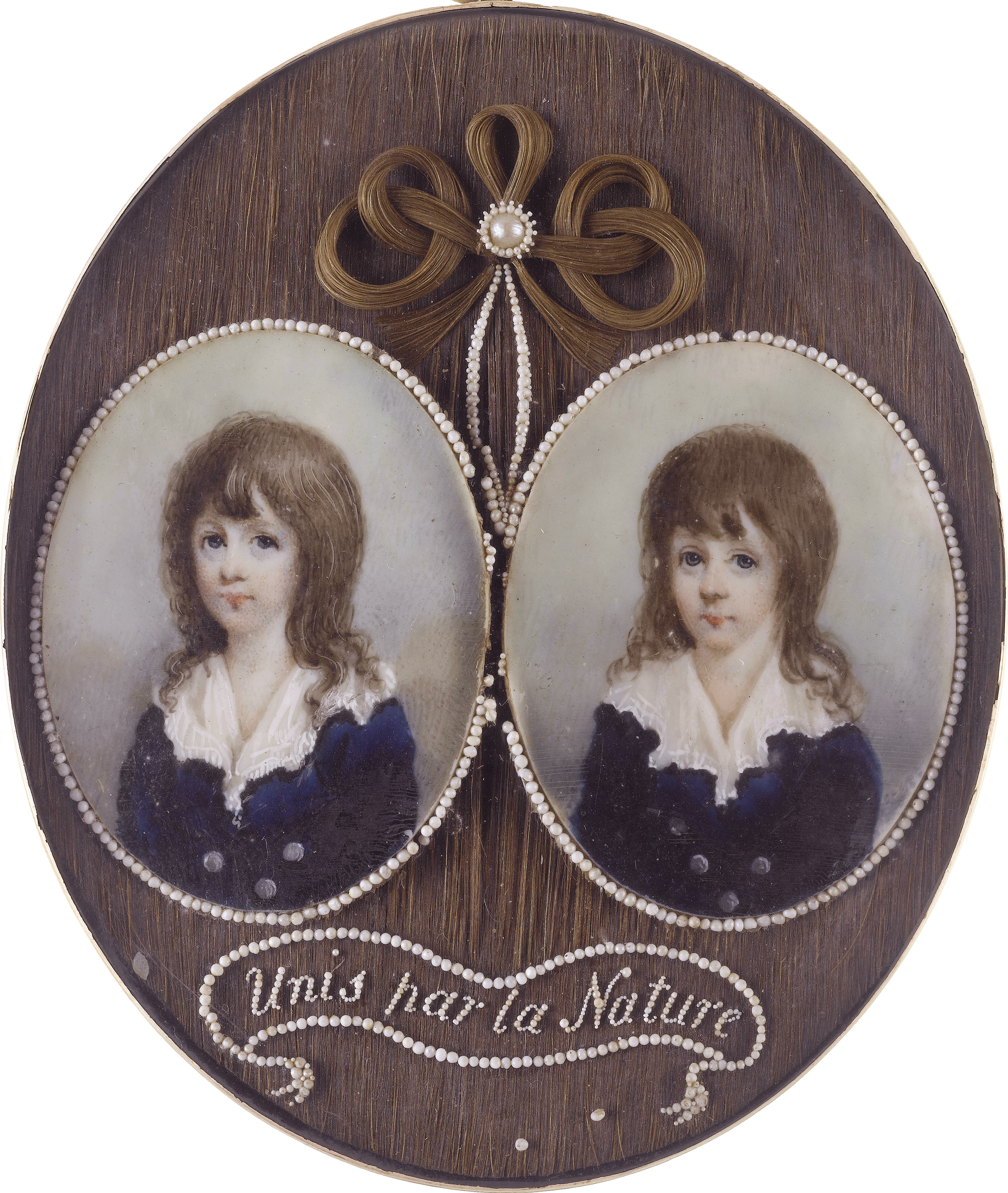
The twin sons of Lord Norbury, Daniel Toler (1781–1832) and Hector John Graham-Toler (1781–1839) (Horace Hone)

On 2 June 1778, Lord Norbury married Grace, daughter of Hector Graham and Isabella Maxwell. They had two sons and two daughters, including:

- Lady Letitia Toler (c. 1780–1847), who married William Browne, son of Robert Browne and Eleanor Morres, in 1813.
- Daniel Toler, 2nd Baron Norwood (1781–1832), who was considered "insane" and died unmarried.
- Hector John Graham-Toler, 2nd Earl of Norbury (1781–1839), who married Elizabeth Brabazon, daughter of William Brabazon and Elizabeth Phibbs, in 1808.

In 1797 Grace was raised to the Peerage of Ireland as Baroness Norwood, of Knockalton in the County of Tipperary, in honour of her husband. She died in 1822 and was succeeded in the barony by her eldest son, Daniel. Lord Norbury survived her by nine years and died at his Dublin home at 3 Great Denmark Street in July 1831, aged 85. He was succeeded in the barony of Norbury by his eldest son Daniel and in the viscountcy and earldom according to the special remainder by his second son, Hector. In 1832 the latter also succeeded his elder brother in the baronies of Norwood and Norbury. He was considered to be the father of John Brinkley. He was shot "by an assassin, in his own plantation" at Durrow in 1839, although if his obituary is to be believed he had gone further than most Ascendancy landlords to assuage his tenants' lot.

Parliament of Ireland
Preceded by Richard Underwood; Boyle Roche	Member of Parliament for Tralee; 1776–1783; With: Vacant 1776–1777; Thomas Lloyd 1777–1783	Succeeded by William Godfrey; James Carique-Ponsonby
Preceded by John Handcock; Hugh Carleton	Member of Parliament for Philipstown; 1783–1790; With: Henry Cope	Succeeded by William Sankey; Arthur O'Connor
Preceded by Stephen Ram; Richard Vowell	Member of Parliament for Gorey; 1790–1800; With: Charles Monck 1790–1798; William Domville Stanley Monck 1798–1799; Joseph Mason Ormsby 1799–1800	Succeeded by Parliament of the United Kingdom
Legal offices
Preceded by Arthur Wolfe	Solicitor-General for Ireland; 1789–1798	Succeeded by John Stewart
Preceded by Arthur Wolfe	Attorney-General for Ireland; 1798–1800	Succeeded by John Stewart
Preceded by The Viscount Carleton	Chief Justice of the Irish Common Pleas; 1800–1827	Succeeded by William Plunket
Peerage of Ireland
New creation	Earl of Norbury; 1827–1831	Succeeded by Hector John Graham-Toler
New creation	Baron Norbury; 1799–1831	Succeeded by Daniel Toler
