= Thomas Lloyd (Irish politician) =

Irish politician

Thomas Lloyd (1716–1805) was an Irish politician. He served in the Irish House of Commons as the member of Parliament for Tralee between 1777 and 1783.

Parliament of Ireland
Preceded by Viscount Crosbie; John Toler	Member of Parliament for Tralee; 1777–1783; With: John Toler	Succeeded by William Godfrey; James Carique-Ponsonby
