= Tralee (Parliament of Ireland constituency) =

Pre-1801 Irish constituency

- Former borough constituency for the Irish House of Commons
- County: County Kerry
- Borough: Tralee

1613–1801
- Seats: 2
- Replaced by: Tralee (UKHC)

Tralee was a constituency represented in the Irish House of Commons.

== Borough ==
This constituency was the parliamentary borough of Tralee in County Kerry.

Following the Acts of Union 1800 the borough retained one parliamentary seat in the House of Commons of the United Kingdom.

== Members of Parliament ==
It returned two members to the Parliament of Ireland from 1613 to 1800.

- 1613–1615: Robert Blennerhassett and Humphrey Dethicke
- 1634–1635: Sir Beverley Newcomen and Sir George Radcliffe (sat for Armagh – replaced by Robert Blennerhassett)
- 1639–1649: Thomas Maul and Henry Osbourne (Osbourne resigned 1641)
- 1661–1666: John Blennerhassett and Francis Lynn
- 1674: Cpt Robert Blennerhassett

=== 1689–1801 ===
Election	First MP	Second MP
1689	Maurice Hussey	James Hackett
1692	John Blennerhassett	James Waller
1695	John St Leger	Frederick William Mullins
1696	Barry Denny	Frederick William Mullins
1703	Samuel Morris	Arthur Hyde
1713	Samuel Morris	John Blennerhassett
1715	Samuel Morris	Robert Taylor
1723	Conway Blennerhassett	Robert Taylor
1723	Conway Blennerhassett	William Sprigge
1725	Luke Gardiner	William Sprigge
1727	John Blennerhassett	Arthur Blennerhassett
1743	John Blennerhassett	Arthur Blennerhassett
1761	Rowland Bateman	Edward Herbert
1768	Edward Denny	Edward Herbert
1771	Edward Denny	Richard Underwood
1775	Edward Denny	Boyle Roche
1776	John Crosbie, Viscount Crosbie	John Toler
1777	Thomas Lloyd	John Toler
1783	William Godfrey	James Carique-Ponsonby
1790	Crosbie Morgell	Sir Boyle Roche, 1st Bt
1795	William Fletcher	Sir Boyle Roche, 1st Bt
January 1798	Maurice FitzGerald	James Crosbie
1798	Arthur Moore	Henry Kemmis
1801	Succeeded by Westminster constituency Tralee	

== See also ==
- List of Irish constituencies
