= Saints Thaddeus and Bartholomew Church of Tehran =

Iranian national heritage site

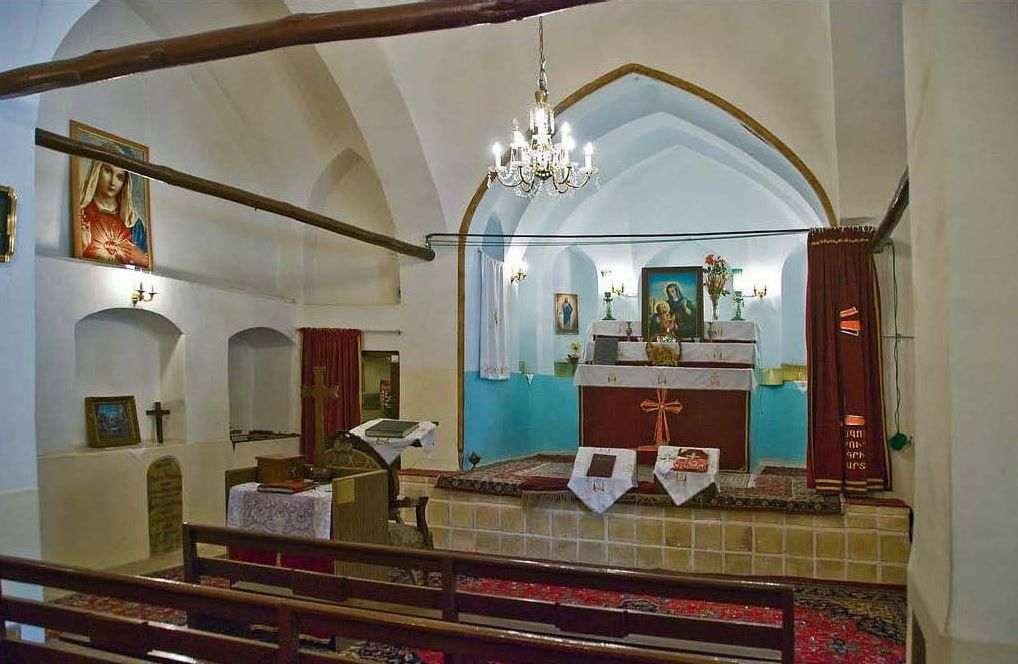
- Interior of the church

- Location within Iran

Religion
- Affiliation: Armenian Apostolic Church
- Rite: Armenian
- Status: Functioning

Location
- Location: Grand Bazaar, Tehran, Iran
- Coordinates: 35.670445°N 51.427427°E

Architecture
- Style: Armenian
- Completed: 1768, rebuilt 1808

Saints Thaddeus and Bartholomew Church of Tehran (Armenian: Սուրբ Թադևոս-Բարդուղիմեոս եկեղեցի; Persian: کلیسای تادئوس و بارتوقیمئوس مقدس) is an Armenian Apostolic church in Tehran, Iran. It is the oldest church in Tehran.

== Location ==
It is located in Armenians Alley کوچه ارامنه, Molavi Avenue (fa), south of Tehran Grand Bazaar, close to the now destroyed southern gate of Tehran.

== History ==
Armenians migrated from New Julfa to Tehran during the reign of Karim Khan Zand, mainly to become involved in his construction plans to make Tehran his capital. These Armenians built Saints Thaddeus and Bartholomew Church in 1768. It was consecrated by Grigor Ter-Hovhannesian in September 1788.

The church building occupies an area of about 220 m², with a small courtyard in combination with a courtyard and rooms totally in an area of 350 m², imitating small churches of New Julfa. In the late 18th and early 19th centuries, the church was the first and only cemetery of Christians in Tehran.

In 1970, original frescoes were discovered underneath the plaster of the interior walls.

== Notable burials ==
- Charles Scott (1805–1841), son of Sir Walter Scott
- Prince Alexander of Georgia (1770–1844), Georgian royal prince
- William Glen (1778–1849), British Christian preacher
- Captain Zatti (d.1849), Austrian teacher at Dar ol-Fonun
- Henry Lindsay Bethune (1787–1851), Scottish military officer
- David Mghrdichian Davidians (fa) (1788–1852), doctor
- Charles Wright Parker Alison (1810–1872), British envoy

The church also contains a memorial stone for the killed Russian ambassador Alexander Griboyedov (1795–1829) whose body was kept here until its transfer to Tbilisi.

== Bibliography ==
- کتاب ارمنیان ایران، نویسنده:آندرانیک هویان، صفحه‌های (۱۱۱ تا ۱۵۷) انتشارات:مرکز بین‌المللی گفتگوی تمدنها با همکاری انتشارات هرمس، تاریخ:۱۳۸۰، شابک:۲-۰۰۷-۳۶۳-۹۶۴
- آلمار هوسپیان، نگاهی به زندگی ارمنیان تهران در گذشته نزدیک، سالنامه رافی، جلد اول، ۱۹۶۹ میلادی، صفحه: ۲۶۷
- «دانشنامهٔ تاریخ معماری و شهرسازی ایران‌شهر». وزارت راه و شهرسازی. بایگانی‌شده از روی نسخه اصلی در ۶ اکتبر ۲۰۱۹. دریافت‌شده در ۶ اکتبر ۲۰۱۹
- ژانت د. لازاریان (۱۳۸۲)، «روحانیون»، دانشنامه ایرانیان ارمنی، تهران: انتشارات هیرمند، ص. ۶۴، شابک ۹۶۴-۶۹۷۴-۵۰-۳
- هوویان، آندرانیک (۱۳۸۰). «کلیساهای ارمنیان در ایران». ارمنیان ایران. تهران: مرکز بین‌المللی گفتگوی فرنگ‌ها با همکاری انتشارات هرمس. ص. ۱۴۹–۱۴۸. شابک ۹۶۴-۳۶۳-۰۰۷-۲
- نخستین فضاهای زیستی و عبادی ارمنیان در تهران قدیم، نویسنده: دکتر حسن کریمیان / آرمینه مارقوسیان، فصلنامه فرهنگی پیمان - شماره ۴۲ - سال یازدهم - زمستان ۱۳۸۶

== See also ==
- Iranian Armenians
- List of Armenian churches in Iran
