= Luke Gardiner =

Irish property developer and politician

- Born: 1690; Dublin
- Died: 25 September 1755 (aged 65)
- Resting place: Dublin, Ireland
- Occupations: Property developer, landowner, politician and banker
- Known for: Developer of Sackville Street
- Relatives: Charles Gardiner (son); Luke Gardiner, 1st Viscount Mountjoy (grandson)

Luke Gardiner (c. 1690 – 25 September 1755) was an Irish property developer and politician.

In the Irish House of Commons he represented Tralee from 1725 until 1727 and Thomastown from 1727 until his death in 1755. He was appointed to the Irish Privy Council on 2 August 1737.

== Early life ==
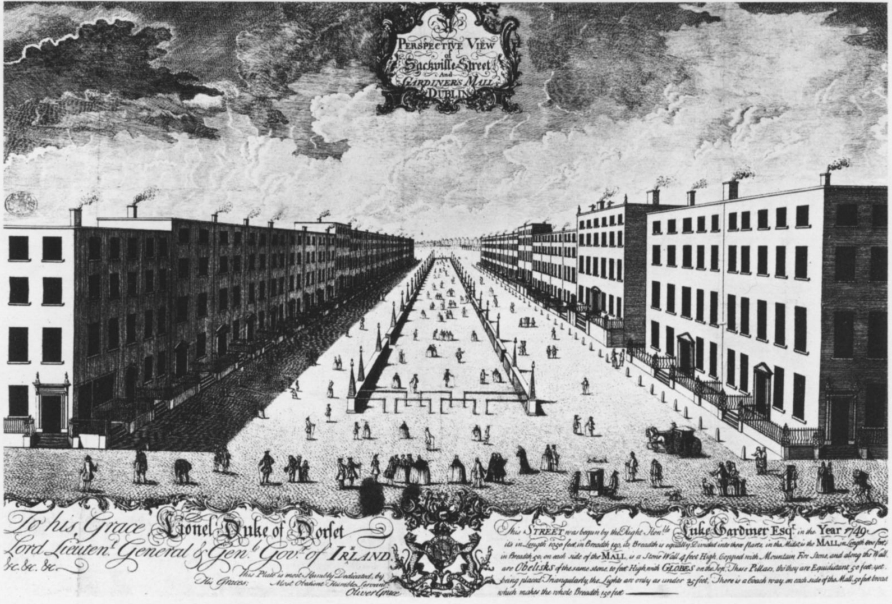
Sackville Street and Gardiner's Mall in the early 1750s, an illustration by Oliver Grace.

He was possibly a son of James Gardiner of the Coombe and whose name was likely of French origin.

In 1711, he married Anne Stewart. Their son Charles also served as an MP and Privy Counsellor.

By 1717, he was recorded as living at Cork Hill.

== Career ==
He was the senior partner in the private bank Gardiner and Hill with Arthur Hill-Trevor on Castle Street until its dissolution in 1739.

During his career Gardiner acquired a wide variety of land and properties throughout Dublin city. The major continuous part, much of which he purchased from the Moore family in 1714, was a large piece of land to the East of the then established city. This estate corresponds to the modern area bounded by The Royal Canal, Dorset Street, the Western Way, Constitution Hill, Parnell Street, O'Connell Street and the River Liffey.

As owner of this land, Gardiner led the development of the Northside of the city east along the river, developing what is now O'Connell Street (then Sackville Street and often referred to as Gardiner's Mall), Dorset Street, Parnell Street and Square (then Rutland Street & Square), and Mountjoy Square.

After his death, his son and heir Charles continued the development, finishing Rutland Square before his grandson, Luke Gardiner (later Lord and Viscount Mountjoy) inherited the estate and accelerated the development further East.

Parliament of Ireland
Preceded by Conway Blennerhassett; William Sprigge	Member of Parliament for Tralee; 1725–1727; With: William Sprigge	Succeeded by John Blennerhassett; Arthur Blennerhassett
Preceded by Richard Bettesworth; John Cuffe	Member of Parliament for Thomastown; 1727–1755; With: Nicholas Aylward	Succeeded by Redmond Morres; Nicholas Aylward
