= Lisbunny, County Tipperary =

Townland in County Tipperary, Ireland

Lisbunny (Irish: Lios Buinne) is a townland and a civil parish in the historical Barony of Ormond Lower, County Tipperary, Ireland. Its location is to the east of Nenagh. The only signage indicating the townland is for Lisbunny Industrial Estate on the north side of the R445 road just after crossing the bridge over the Limerick–Ballybrophy railway line.

== Lisbunny Cemetery and Church ==
Located on the side the R445 road to the eastern side of the townland is the modern cemetery, still in use. British war graves are located here. All that is left of the adjoining Lisbunny church is a ruin. The church was listed in the ecclesiastical taxation of the Diocese of Killaloe in 1302.

== Knockalton/Lisbunny, Standing Stone ==
Bordering the townlands of Knockalton and Lisbunny. The stone, of limestone is 2.15m in height and 60 to 80 cm in width.
