= James Carrique Ponsonby =

MP for Tulsk
- In office 1776–1783
- Preceded by: Nicholas Westby
- Succeeded by: James FitzGerald

MP for Tralee
- In office 1783–1790
- Preceded by: John Toler
- Succeeded by: Boyle Roche

High Sheriff of County Kerry
- In office 1781–1782
- Preceded by: William Godfrey
- Succeeded by: Denis Mahony

James Carrique Ponsonby (1738 – December 1796) [also recorded as Carrigue, Carigue, Carique and Carrick] was an Irish member of parliament (MP) for two different constituencies, high sheriff, justice of the peace and grand juror of County Kerry and an important Irish landowner.

== Biography ==
He was born as James Carrique to Anne Dorothy (née Crosbie) and William Carrique; his mother was the daughter of Lady Margaret Barry and Thomas Crosbie; his father was a lawyer, JP, high sheriff and grand juror, resident at Crotta. He entered Trinity College, Dublin in 1754, aged 16 and is recorded as a JP the following year. Richard Ponsonby, his great uncle who had no children, willed the Crotta estate to his father on 10 February 1762 with the proviso that both father and son take the Ponsonby name. When the will was proved in 1764, Carrique duly became James Carrique Ponsonby.

On 3 May 1766, he married Mary O'Hara, daughter of Charles O'Hara, MP for Ballynakill and then Armagh Borough, and Lady Mary (née Carmichael), daughter of Brigadier-General James Carmichael, 2nd Earl of Hyndford, a descendant of James V of Scotland and Henry VII. He became the owner of a property in Clare Street, Dublin, in 1769. The couple had two children, William, born in 1770, and Richard, born c. 1773. The following year he transferred ownership of the Dublin house to his father-in-law. From 1776 to 1783, he was the MP for Tulsk and during this period was high sheriff of Kerry from 1781 to 1782. He and his wife separated in 1778 and as part of the deed of settlement she was granted £500 annually. The History of the Irish Parliament claims that his wife was said to have "run away with Lord Bellomont" (Charles Coote) in 1782; this is four years post-separation, however a contemporaneous deed did exist between Carrique Ponsonby and Coote. On 28 April 1781, he made an application for the next session of parliament to raise funds by mortgage or sale of properties in County Limerick (devised to him by his great uncle) to pay debts affecting his properties in Kerry and for these funds to service his separation settlement and to provide for other circumstances. He transferred land in Limerick to his wife's brother Charles, the income from which would be hers. His father had remarried to Margaret Crosbie in 1766; although his father died in 1774, his will wasn't proved until July 1782 but mentioned him, his stepmother Margaret, and his son William. From 1783 to 1790, he was one of two MPs for Tralee, the other being William Godfrey, his predecessor as high sheriff. He died aged 58 in 1796 and was buried in the Ponsonby tomb at Kilflynn Church (now St. Columba's Heritage Centre), close to Crotta.
