= Arthur Moore (Tralee MP) =

Irish lawyer, judge and politician

Rt. Hon. Arthur Moore (1765 – 6 January 1846) was an Irish lawyer, judge, and politician.

Moore was the second son of Lewis Moore II and his wife and cousin Margaret Moore, of Prospect House, Durrow, County Laois. He was educated at the Royal School, Armagh, at Trinity College Dublin, and the Middle Temple. He was called to the bar in Ireland in 1788, and became a King's Counsel in 1798.

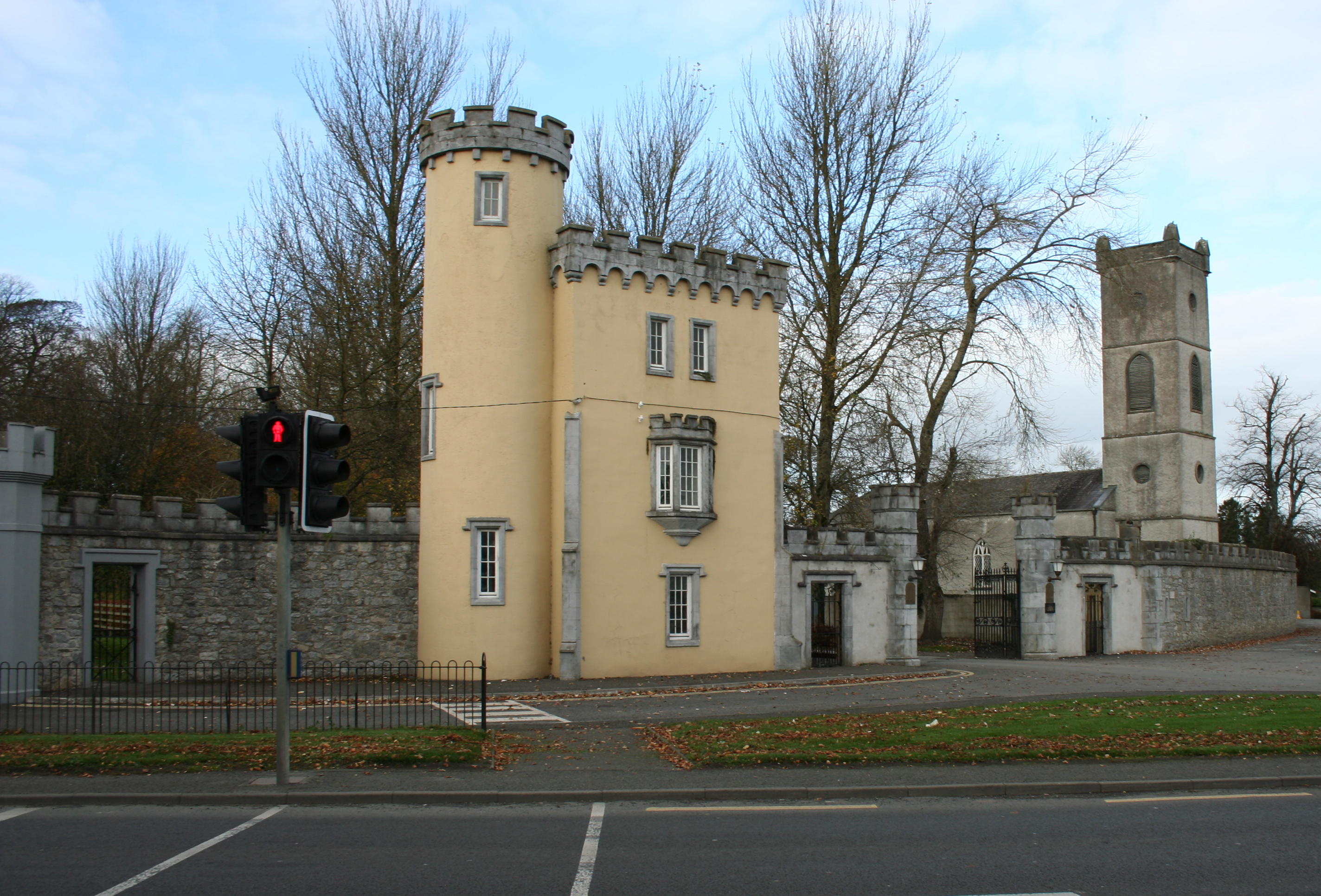
Durrow, Moore's birthplace

== Career ==
In 1798 he was elected to the House of Commons of Ireland for the borough of Tralee. An opponent of the Act of Union, he was one of the members co-opted to sit in the 1st Parliament of the United Kingdom, for the reconstituted seat of Tralee. He was slow to take his seat in Westminster, but did so by June 1801, and was a fairly frequent contributor to the debates in that session. He did not seek re-election in 1802.

He was appointed Third Serjeant-at-law (Ireland) in 1801. Though this was a Government office, it was often regarded as superfluous and was sometimes left vacant for years. Moore was recommended for it as "a very respectable lawyer and MP": despite his opposition to the Union, he was generally seen as a reliable Government man, even supporting measures which were widely unpopular. In 1811, for example, he defended the Dublin government's suppression of Catholic political meetings. In 1805 he was promoted to the senior and more onerous position of First Serjeant, the traditional title of Prime Serjeant being dropped. The First Serjeant had precedence over the other two Serjeants and ordinary barristers, but not over the Law Officers.

In 1814–15, as First Serjeant, he was much occupied in putting down agrarian disturbances in the South of Ireland. From July 1816 to February 1839, he served as a Justice of the Court of Common Pleas in Ireland. The appointment was well received: he was a good lawyer, if not of the first rank, and was extremely popular. He was sworn a member of the Privy Council of Ireland in 1839.

In the summer of 1839, some six months after his retirement from the Bench, being, as he put it, "73 or 74 years old" he gave evidence to a Select Committee of the House of Lords on the state of crime in Ireland. His opinion, which the Lords treated with obvious respect, was that there was a good deal of crime in the country, but he believed that in recent years there had been a general improvement in the overall situation.

He died at his seat, Lamberton Park, Maryborough, County Laois, in 1846. He had inherited Lamberton in 1803 from his cousin Sir John Tydd, 1st Baronet (Sir John's mother was Elizabeth Moore, daughter of Pierce Moore of Loran and Cremorgan, Timahoe, County Laois), who had bought Lamberton about 1790, and improved the property greatly. Arthur's heirs sold it shortly after his death. Sir Walter Scott visited Lamberton in 1825, and was greatly impressed by Moore's hospitality. Nothing survives now of the house, except part of the gate.

== Family ==
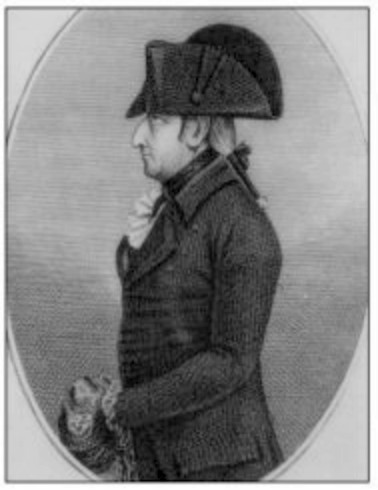
Andrew Robinson Stoney, Moore's notoriously abusive brother-in-law

He married Frances Stoney, daughter of George Stoney of Greyfort, Borrisokane, County Tipperary and Elizabeth Johnston, and a younger sister of Andrew Robinson Stoney (later Stoney-Bowes) MP, who was notorious for his appalling ill-treatment of both his wives, and who died in a debtor's prison in 1810.

They had at least four children, including the Reverend John Tydd Moore, Vicar of Erke (Eirke), County Kilkenny, Frances Margaretta, who married John Balfour Magenis, younger son of Richard Magenis, and Elizabeth, who married William Persse of County Galway and Rathgar, Dublin, a cousin of the celebrated writer Lady Gregory.

John Tydd Moore committed suicide in January 1865 by cutting his throat. His death seems to have been unexpected, and the inquest brought in a verdict of "temporary insanity" (thus permitting him a Christian burial, which was otherwise denied to suicides). By his wife, Charlotte Bocķett, daughter of John and Rebecca Bockett of Southcote Lodge, Reading, Berkshire, he had a numerous family. Their eldest son, the younger Arthur, followed him into the Church and became Dean of Achonry. Arthur died in 1882.

Parliament of Ireland
Preceded by Maurice FitzGerald; James Crosbie	Member of Parliament for Tralee; 1798–1800; With: Henry Kemmis	Succeeded by Parliament of the United Kingdom
Parliament of the United Kingdom
Preceded by Parliament of Ireland	Member of Parliament for Tralee; 1801–1802	Succeeded by George Canning
