= William Sprigge =

Irish politician

William Sprigge (1678 – 15 August 1735) was an Irish politician.

Sprigge served in the Irish House of Commons as the Member of Parliament for Tralee between 1723 and 1727. He was then elected to sit for Banagher from 1729 until his death in 1735.

Parliament of Ireland
Preceded by Conway Blennerhassett; Robert Taylor	Member of Parliament for Tralee; 1723–1727; With: Conway Blennerhassett (1723–1725); Luke Gardiner (1725–1727)	Succeeded by John Blennerhassett; Arthur Blennerhassett
Preceded by George Holmes; Charles Patrick Plunket	Member of Parliament for Banagher; 1729–1735; With: George Holmes (1729–1734); Galbraith Holmes (1734–1735)	Succeeded by Galbraith Holmes; Robert Holmes
