= Hector Graham-Toler, 2nd Earl of Norbury =

Irish peer

The Right Honourable The Earl of Norbury DL
- Born: Hector John Toler; 27 June 1781
- Died: 3 January 1839 (aged 57); Durrow Abbey, Tullamore, Ireland
- Spouse: Elizabeth Brabazon (m. 1808; died 1839)
- Children: 12, including Hector
- Parent(s): John Toler, 1st Earl of Norbury; Grace Toler, 1st Baroness Norwood
- Relatives: Hector Graham-Toler, 3rd Earl of Norbury (grandson)

Hector John Graham-Toler, 2nd Earl of Norbury DL (27 June 1781 – 3 January 1839) was an Irish peer.

== Early life ==
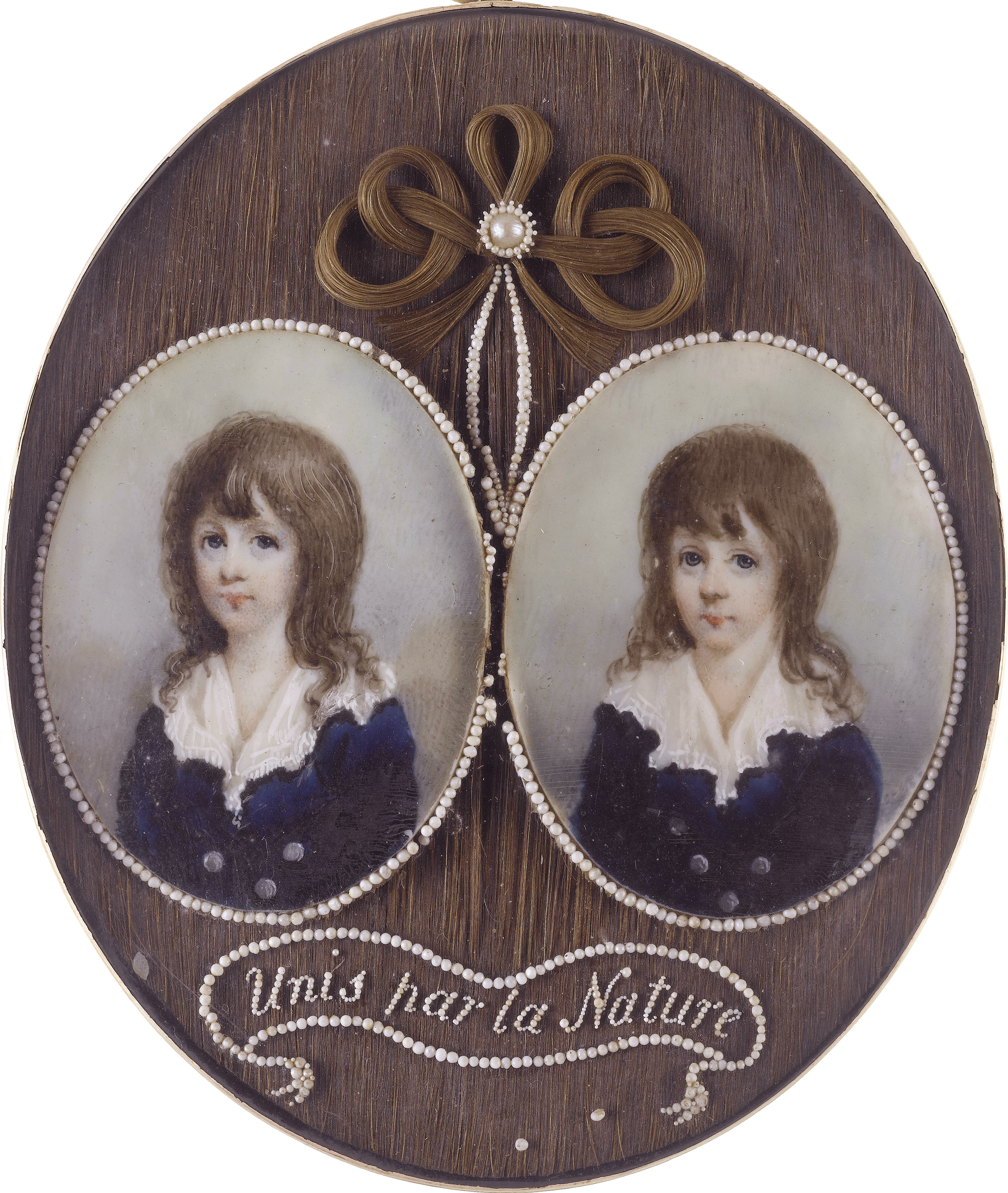
Portrait of Lord Norbury, and his twin brother, Daniel, by Horace Hone, before 1825

Hector John Toler was born on 27 June 1781. He was the son of John Toler, 1st Earl of Norbury and Grace Graham, suo jure 1st Baroness Norwood of Knockalton. He had two sisters and one brother, including Lady Letitia Toler (wife of William Browne), and Daniel Toler, 2nd Baron Norwood, who "was of unsound mind" and never unmarried.

His father was the youngest son of Daniel Toler of Beechwood, and Letitia Otway (a daughter of Thomas Otway, of Castle Otway). His uncle, Daniel Toler, was High Sheriff of Tipperary and also MP for County Tipperary. The Toler family was originally from Norfolk, but settled in Ireland in the 17th century during the reign of Charles I, when an ancestor who was a successful soldier in Cronwell's army obtained a grant of lands in County Tipperary and settled at Beechwood. His maternal grandparents were Hector Graham, an official in the Court of Common Pleas, and Isabella (née Maxwell) Graham (a daughter of Robert Maxwell of Fellows Hall).

== Career ==
On 26 November 1825 his name was legally changed to Hector John Graham-Toler by Royal Licence. Upon the death of his father on 27 July 1831, he succeeded, as the second son by special remainder, as the 2nd Earl of Norbury and 2nd Viscount Glandine, of Glandine, King's County, both in the Peerage of Ireland. Upon the death of his elder brother on 30 June 1832, he succeeded as the 3rd Baron Norwood of Knockalton, County Tipperary, and 3rd Baron Norbury of Ballycrenode, County Tipperary, both in the Peerage of Ireland.

He served as Deputy Lieutenant of Queen's County. Although in his obituary in The Gentleman's Magazine, it stated:

Politics he had none; he gave no leases to his tenants, and consequently had no influence at elections; he could not even be influenced to go to vote himself, and his apathy, in this respect, had offended the high Tory party who thought he ought to be with them.

== Personal life ==
On 1 January 1808, Toler married Elizabeth Brabazon (1791–1859), only child and heiress of William Brabazon of Brabazon Park, County Meath (brother to Sir Anthony Brabazon, 1st Baronet), and Elizabeth (née Phibbs) Brabazon (daughter and heiress of John Phibbs, of Lisconny). Together, they were the parents of four sons and eight daughters, including:

- Hector John Graham-Toler, 3rd Earl of Norbury (1810–1873), who married Lady Steuart Bethune, daughter of Sir Henry Bethune, 1st Baronet and Coutts Trotter, in 1848.
- Lady Elizabeth Graham-Toler (1811–1844), who married Hon. Laurence Parsons, son of Laurence Parsons, 2nd Earl of Rosse and Alice Lloyd, in 1836.
- Lady Grace Graham-Toler (1813–1872), who married Col. Crofton Moore Vandeleur, son of John Ormsby Vandeleur and Lady Frances Moore (a daughter of the 1st Marquess of Drogheda), in 1832.
- Lady Helen Graham-Toler (1814–1883), who married John Vandeleur Stewart, son of Alexander Stewart and Lady Mary Moore (a daughter of the 1st Marquess of Drogheda), in 1837.
- Lady Georgina Graham-Toler (1819–1900), who married, as his second wife, John Gurdon Rebow, son of Theophilus Thornhagh Gurdon and Anne Mellish (a daughter of William Mellish), in 1845.
- Hon. Otway Fortescue Graham-Toler (1824–1884), who married Hon. Henrietta Elizabeth Scarlett, daughter of Robert Scarlett, 2nd Baron Abinger and Sarah Smith, in 1846.
- Lady Charlotte Sarah Graham-Toler (1826–1867), who married Richard Neville, 4th Baron Braybrooke, son of Richard Griffin, 3rd Baron Braybrooke and Lady Jane Cornwallis (a daughter of the 2nd Marquess Cornwallis), in 1852. After his death in 1861, she married Dr. Frederic Hetley in 1862.
- Lady Isabella Rebecca Graham-Toler (1828–1914), who married Alexander John Robert Stewart, son of Alexander Robert Stewart and Lady Caroline Pratt (a daughter of the 1st Marquess Camden), in 1851.

On 1 January 1839, at age 57, Lord Norbury was shot six times by his butler (who may have been associated with the Ribbonmen) at his home, Durrow Abbey (sometimes called Castle Durrow) in Tullamore, County Offaly, Ireland. He "lingered for two days, and then expired" on 3 January. He was succeeded in his titles by his eldest surviving son, Hector

Peerage of Ireland
Preceded by John Toler	Earl of Norbury; 1831–1839	Succeeded by Hector John Graham-Toler
Preceded by Daniel Toler	Baron Norbury; 1832–1839	Succeeded by Hector John Graham-Toler
