= Obadiah Bull =

Possible Irish lawyer

Obadiah Bull is said to have been an Irish lawyer who lived and practised in London during the reign of Henry VII (1485–1509). His last name is supposed to have been the origin of the term "That's a Bull", for nonsense or a blunder made by an Irishman. He was known to make absurd, half-nonsensical statements that contradicted themselves. A type of Irish joke, an "Irish bull" is styled after these. The term first occurs in a periodical, The British Apollo, in 1740.

However the Oxford English Dictionary says (s.v. bull, n.^{4}): "No foundation appears for ... the assertion of the ‘British Apollo’ (No. 22. 1708) that ‘it became a Proverb from the repeated Blunders of one Obadiah Bull, a Lawyer of London, who liv'd in the Reign of K. Henry the Seventh’.)" Equally, the Oxford Dictionary of National Biography contains no Obadiah Bull.

(The OED gives the etymology "[Of unknown origin; cf. O[ld] F[rench] boul, boule, bole fraud, deceit, trickery; mod[ern] Icel[andic] bull ‘nonsense’; also M[iddle] E[nglish] bull BUL ‘falsehood’, and BULL v.3, to befool, mock, cheat.")
