= Arthur Blennerhassett (1687–1758) =

Anglo-Irish lawyer, politician and judge

Arthur Blennerhassett KC (1687 – 3 January 1758) was an Anglo-Irish lawyer, politician and judge. He is remembered mainly for killing John St. Leger in a duel.

He was the only son of the politician and lawyer Robert Blennerhassett of Clonmel, County Tipperary, and Alice Osborne, daughter of Sir Thomas Osborne, 5th Baronet and Katherine Butler, and widow of Thomas Warter. He was at school in Dublin and graduated from Trinity College, Dublin in 1708. The same year he entered the Middle Temple. He was called to the Irish Bar in 1714, made King's Counsel in 1728, and served as Prime Serjeant in 1742. In 1727 Blennerhassett was elected to the Irish House of Commons as Member of Parliament for Tralee. He was raised to the bench as a justice of the Court of King's Bench (Ireland) in 1743 and served until his death in 1758.

In 1745 he was one of the judges who presided at the perjury trial which resulted from the celebrated Annesley Peerage Case. Unfortunately, the proceedings, which lasted from early morning to late in the evening without a single break, were so exhausting that he simply collapsed, leaving his Chief, Thomas Marlay, to continue the trial alone. Ball notes disapprovingly that his behaviour did little credit to a man who was surely accustomed to sitting for long hours in Court and Parliament, nor any credit to the Government which had seen fit to appoint him.

He married firstly Mary Pope, daughter of Captain Richard Pope and Anne Ingolsby, and secondly Mary Rice, daughter of Edward Rice and widow of Colonel William Degge; on her mother's side Mary Rice was a granddaughter of Thomas St Lawrence, 13th Baron Howth. He had no children by either marriage. He lived at Dawson Street in Dublin and Riddlestown Park in County Limerick, which he inherited from his uncle Edward Blennerhassett, who married the heiress Elizabeth Windall. Arthur made extensive improvements to Riddlestown.

According to Elrington Ball he was accused but acquitted of the murder of John St Leger, a younger son of Arthur St Leger, 1st Viscount Doneraile and Elizabeth Hayes, whom he killed in a duel in 1741. It was very rare at the time for a fatal duel among members of the aristocracy to lead to a conviction for murder, and the killing did not damage his reputation or his future career.

A portrait of the judge hangs in the library of Glin Castle.

Parliament of Ireland
Preceded by Luke Gardiner; William Sprigge	Member of Parliament for Tralee; 1727–1743; With: John Blennerhassett	Succeeded by John Blennerhassett; Arthur Blennerhassett
