= Irish bull =

Ludicrous, incongruent or absurd statement

An Irish bull is a ludicrous, incongruent or logically absurd statement, generally unrecognized as such by its author. The inclusion of the epithet Irish is a late addition.

John Pentland Mahaffy, Provost of Trinity College, Dublin, observed, "an Irish bull is always pregnant", i.e. with truthful meaning. The "father" of the Irish bull is often said to be Sir Boyle Roche, who once asked "Why should we put ourselves out of our way to do anything for posterity, for what has posterity ever done for us?". Roche may have been Sheridan's model for Mrs Malaprop.

== Origin ==
The derivation of "bull" in this sense is unclear. It may be related to Old French boul "fraud, deceit, trickery", Icelandic bull "nonsense", Middle English bull "falsehood", or the verb bull "befool, mock, cheat".

As the Oxford English Dictionary points out, the epithet "Irish" is a more recent addition, the original word bull for such nonsense having been traced back at least to the early 17th century. By the late 19th century the expression Irish bull was well known, but writers were expressing reservations such as: "But it is a cruel injustice to poor Paddy to speak of the genuine 'bull' as something distinctly Irish, when countless examples of the same kind of blunder, not a whit less startling, are to be found elsewhere." The passage continues, presenting Scottish, English and French specimens in support.

== Examples ==
- "He'll regret it till his dying day, if ever he lives that long." – "Red" Will Danaher, in The Quiet Man
- "If I could drop dead right now, I'd be the happiest man alive." – Samuel Goldwyn, movie producer (1882–1974)
- "Always go to other people's funerals, otherwise they won't come to yours." – Misattributed to Yogi Berra, baseball player (1925–2015)
- "There'll be people dying in this town who've never f---ing [sic] died before" – Belfast taxi driver
- "to make an Irish bull, I should expect the next stage in Evolution not to be a stage in Evolution at all" – C.S. Lewis, in Mere Christianity

== See also ==
- Colemanballs – Verbal gaffes
- Comparative illusion – Sentences that appear to make sense but actually do not
- Oxymoron – Figure of speech
- Obadiah Bull – Possible Irish lawyer

== Other references ==
- Grierson, Philip (1938). Irish bulls. Cambridge.
- Kelly, H. P. (1908). Irish bulls and puns. New York.
