= Knockalton Upper =

Townland in County Tipperary, Ireland

Knockalton Upper (Irish: Cnoc Alltáin Uachtarach) is a townland in the historical Barony of Ormond Upper, County Tipperary, Ireland.

== Location ==
Knockalton Upper is located south of Knockalton Lower in north County Tipperary. It is south-west of Nenagh in the vicinity of junction 25 of the M7 motorway.
