= Conway Blennerhassett =

Member of the Irish House of Commons

Conway Blennerhassett KC (3 October 1693 – 7 June 1724) was a member of the Irish House of Commons.

Blennerhassett was born at Castle Conway in County Kerry, the eldest son of John 'Black Jack' Blennerhassett and Elizabeth Cross. He was the grandson of Robert Blennerhassett. He was educated at Trinity College, Dublin, before entering Middle Temple in London in 1710. He was a practising lawyer and was invested as a member of the King's Counsel. He served as the Member of Parliament for Tralee from 1723 to 1725.

He married Elizabeth Harman, the daughter of Colonel Wentworth Harman, with whom he had five children. He died prematurely at the age of 30. His grandson was Harman Blennerhassett.

Parliament of Ireland
Preceded by Samuel Morris; Robert Taylor	Member of Parliament for Tralee; 1723–1725; With: Robert Taylor (1723); William Sprigge (1723–1725)	Succeeded by Luke Gardiner; William Sprigge
