= Henry Lindsay Bethune =

British East India Company Army officer

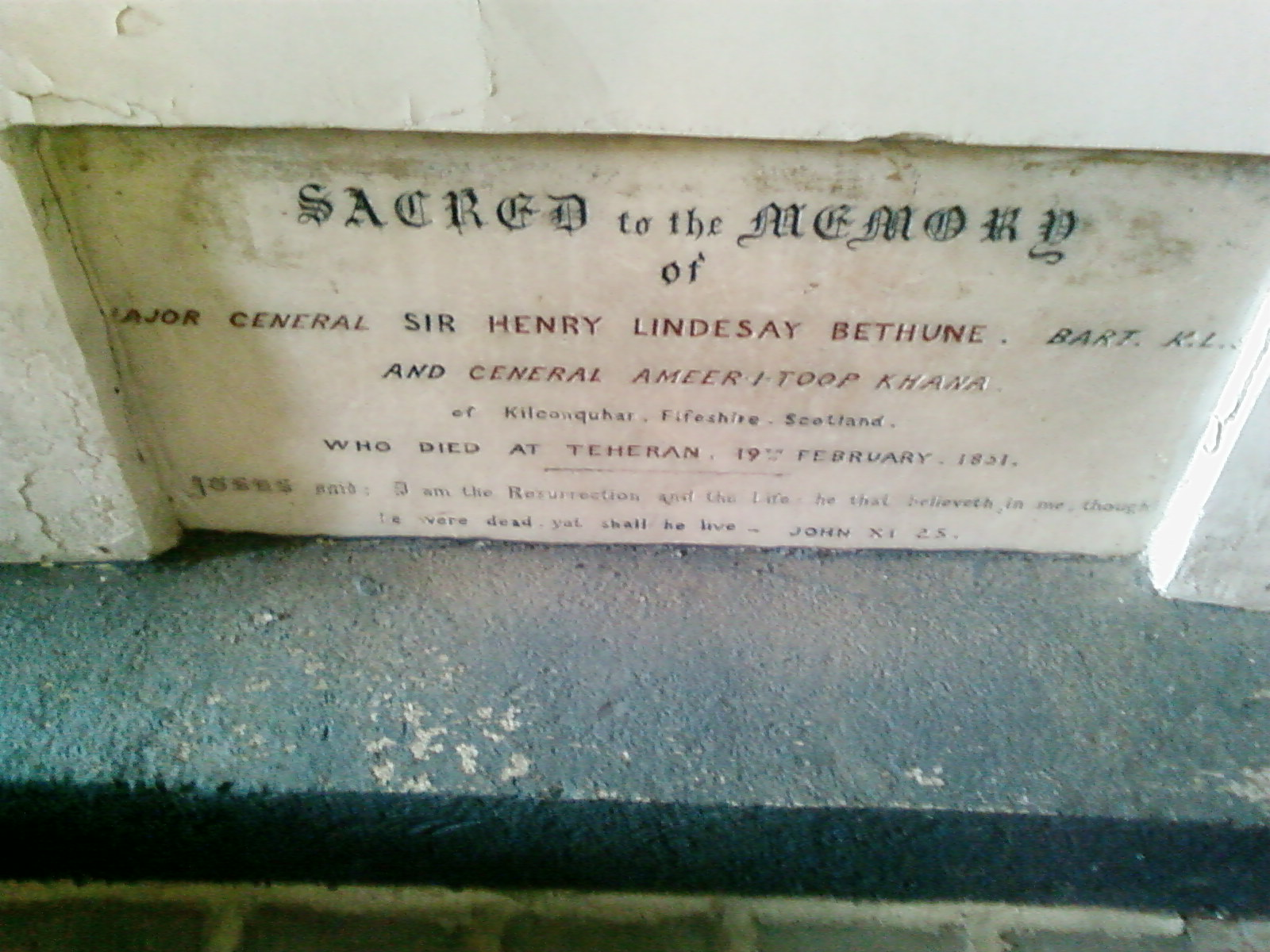
Tombstone of Bethune at the Saints Thaddeus and Bartholomew Church of Tehran

Major-General Sir Henry Lindsay Bethune, 1st Baronet, de jure 9th Earl of Lindsay (born Lindsay; 12 April 1787 – 19 February 1851) was a Scottish military officer. He was a member of a British diplomatic and military mission led by John Malcolm to the Persian Empire in 1810.

== Biography ==
Born Henry Lindsay in Fife, he was a male-line descendant of Patrick Lindsay, 4th Lord Lindsay of the Byres, ancestor of the Earls of Crawford and Earls of Lindsay. He was the son of Maj. Martin Eccles Lindsay and Margaret Augusta Tovey. In 1779, his paternal grandfather adopted the surname and arms of Bethune as part of the entail of inheriting the estate of Kilconquhar from his maternal uncle. Henry Lindsay also added Bethune for the same reason after his father's death in 1813.

Bethune was initially an artillery lieutenant in the Madras Horse Artillery. With a height of 6 feet 8 inches, he is said to have impressed the Persians who compared him to the mythical hero Rustam. His qualities of justice and his knowledge of the world also seem to have greatly impressed the Persians.

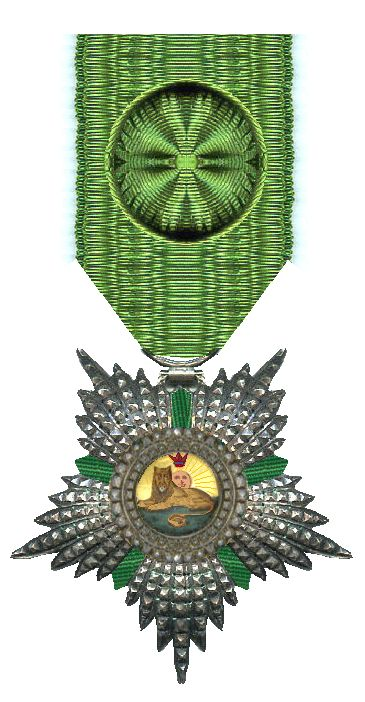
Henry Lindsay Bethune received the Order of the Lion and the Sun in 1816.

Bethune was first put in charge of modernizing the corps of horse artillery. In 1816, Bethune received the Persian decoration of the Order of the Lion and the Sun, specially reserved for meritous foreigners. After several years, he finally resigned from the Indian service, and retired to Kilconquhar. According to the 19th century British diplomat Sir Justin Sheil:

"English influence becoming supreme, and the French Mission having quitted Persia, it was determined to accede to the wishes of the Persian Government and continue the same military organization. Sir John Malcolm was accompanied in 1808 by two officers of the Indian army, Major Christie and Lieutenant Lindsay, to whom was confided this duty: they did it well.

Major Christie was a man of considerable military endowments; he undertook the charge of the infantry, and was killed at his post at the battle of Aslandooz in 1812. His able successor was Major Hart, of the Royal Army. Under the auspices and indefatigable cooperation of Abbas Meerza, heir apparent to the throne of Persia, by whom absolute authority was confided to him, he brought the infantry of Azerbaijan to a wonderful state of perfection.

The artillery was placed under Lieutenant Lindsay, afterwards Major-General Sir H. Lindsay. This officer acquired extraordinary influence in the army, and in particular among the artillery. He brought this branch of the forces in Azerbaijan to such a pitch of real working perfection, and introduced so complete a system of esprit de corps, that to this day his name is venerated, and traces of his instruction still survive in the artillery of that province, which even now preserves some degree of efficiency."

— Sir Justin Sheil (1803–1871).

In 1834, he was recalled for service in Persia in anticipation of troubles in the dynastic succession on the Persian throne. Following the death of Fath Ali Shah that same year, he commanded the advanced Divisions of the Persian Army between Tabriz and Teheran. He supported the succession of the Shah's grandson Mohammad Shah Qajar, and eliminated a serious rebellion led by the Prince of Shiraz.

Henry Lindsay returned to Britain, where on 7 March 1836 he was created a 1st Baronet Bethune of Kilconquhar but was again sent to Persia in 1836 to become a major general in the Persian Army, until his retirement in 1839 following a disagreement with the Persian government over the Persian attacks on Herat in Afghanistan (a territory claimed by Great Britain).

In the wake of the Herat affair, Great Britain would remove its military and diplomatic missions from Persia, and occupy Kharg Island and attack Bushehr. Mohammad Shah Qajar would in turn resume diplomatic relations with France, and send a diplomatic mission to Louis-Philippe under Mirza Hossein Khan to obtain military help. In response, a group of French officers was sent to Persia with the returning ambassador.

== Family ==
In 1822, Bethune married Coutts Trotter, daughter of John Trotter of Dyrham Park, Hertfordshire, who was named after her uncle Sir Coutts Trotter, 1st Baronet. They had three sons and five daughters.

- Anne Catherine Bethune (1823–1903), married John Thomas Campbell
- Stewart (or Steuart) Lindsay Bethune (1825–1904), married Hector Graham-Toler, 3rd Earl of Norbury, eldest son of Hector Graham-Toler, 2nd Earl of Norbury.
- John Trotter Bethune, 10th Earl of Lindsay (1827–1894), married Jeanne Eudoxie Marie Duval of Bordeaux
- Caroline Felicie Bethune (1828–1891), died unmarried
- Henry James Hamilton Bethune (1834–1862), d.s.p.
- Charlotte Jane Bethune (1835–1855), died unmarried
- Coutts (later Jane Coutts) Bethune (1839–1909), married James Stuart Trotter
- Martin William Bethune (1843–1859), died unmarried in Marseille

Sir Henry died in Tabriz, Persia in 1851. Relations between the two countries would soon worsen further with the Anglo-Persian War. He was buried at the Armenian Church of Saints Thaddeus and Bartholomew in Tehran.

Their eldest son, Sir John Trotter Bethune, 2nd Baronet, claimed the title of Earl of Lindsay, which had fallen into abeyance after the death of the sixth earl. Having successfully proven his claim, John was recognised as the 10th Earl of Lindsay by the House of Lords on 5 April 1878, making his father the de jure 9th Earl of Lindsay. The baronetcy became extinct after the 10th Earl died without heirs.

== See also ==
- Iran-United Kingdom relations
- France-Iran relations

Baronetage of the United Kingdom
New creation	Baronet (of Kilconquhar); 1836–1851	Succeeded by John Trotter Bethune
Peerage of Scotland
Preceded by Patrick Lindsay	de jure Earl of Lindsay; 1839–1851	Succeeded by John Trotter Bethune successfully claimed 1878
