= William Domville Stanley Monck =

Anglo-Irish politician (1763–1840)

William Domville Stanley Monck (1763 – August 1840) was an Anglo-Irish politician.

Monck was the Member of Parliament for Coleraine in the Irish House of Commons between 1795 and 1797, before representing Gorey from 1798 to 1799.

Parliament of Ireland
Preceded by George Jackson; George FitzGerald Hill	Member of Parliament for Coleraine; 1795–1797; With: George Jackson (1795–1796); John Staunton Rochfort (1796–1797)	Succeeded by Earl of Tyrone; John Beresford
Preceded by Charles Monck; John Toler	Member of Parliament for Gorey; 1798–1799; With: John Toler	Succeeded by Joseph Mason Ormsby; John Toler
