= Sir George Jackson, 1st Baronet, of Fort Hill =

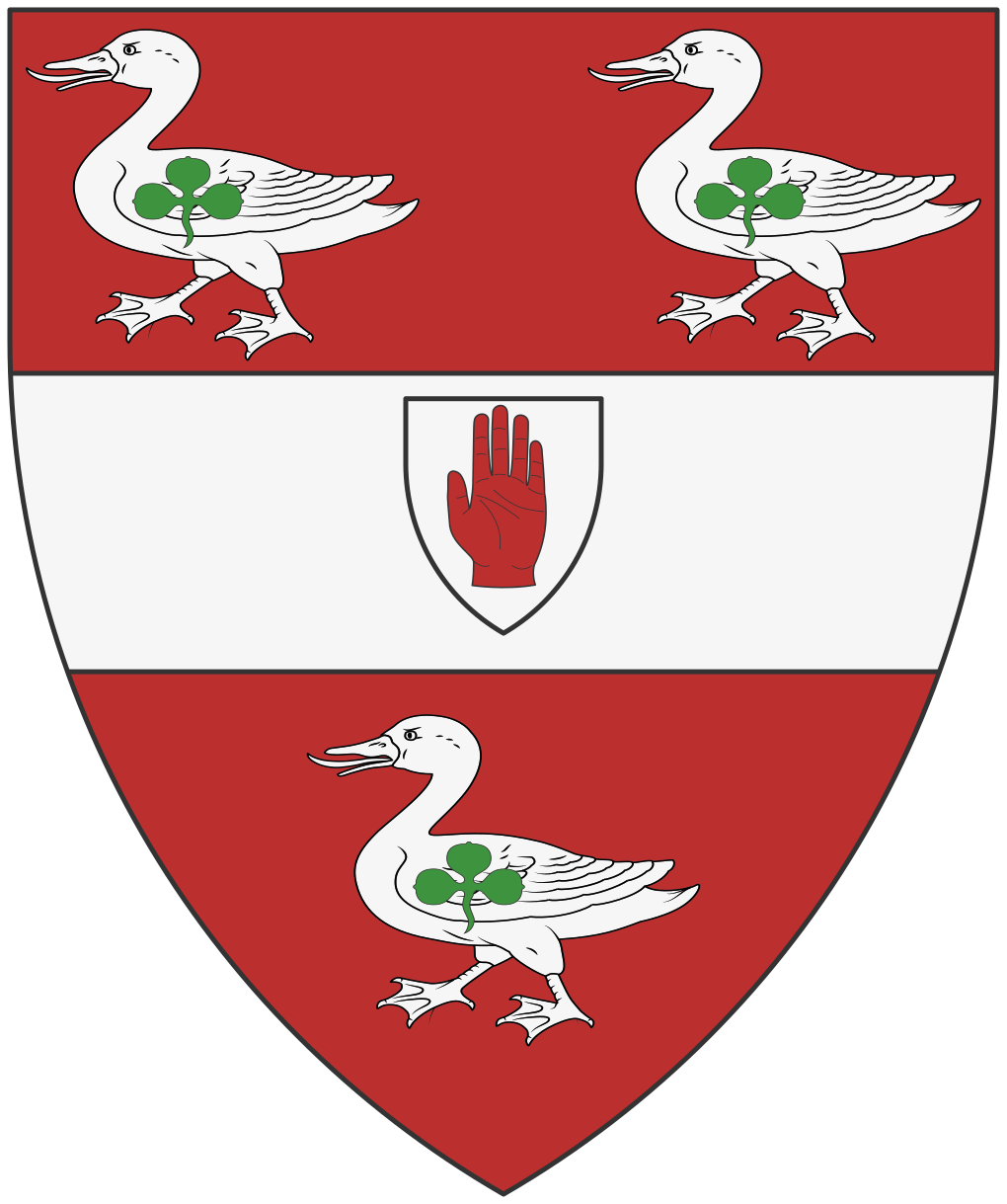
The coat of arms of Jackson of Fort Hill, Baronets.

Sir George Jackson, 1st Baronet (1770 – 1846) was an Anglo-Irish politician.

Jackson was the Member of Parliament for Coleraine in the Irish House of Commons between 1789 and 1796, before representing Randalstown from 1797 until the seat's disenfranchisement under the Acts of Union 1800. On 21 April 1813, he was created a baronet of Forkhill, County Armagh in the Baronetage of the United Kingdom. The title became extinct upon his death in 1846.

Parliament of Ireland
Preceded by Arthur Wolfe; Richard Jackson	Member of Parliament for Coleraine; 1789–1796; With: John Beresford (1789–1791); George FitzGerald Hill (1791–1795); William Domville Stanley Monck (1795–1796)	Succeeded by John Staunton Rochfort; William Domville Stanley Monck
Preceded by Edward Corry; John Dunn	Member of Parliament for Randalstown; 1797–1800; With: Isaac Corry (1798); James McClelland (1798–1800)	Succeeded by Constituency disenfranchised
Baronetage of the United Kingdom
New creation	Baronet (of Fort Hill); 1813–1846	Extinct
Preceded by Dudley baronets	Jackson baronets of Fort Hill; 21 April 1813	Succeeded by Beckett baronets
