= Barry Denny (Tralee MP) =

Irish politician

Barry Denny was an Irish politician.

Denny was born in County Cork and educated at Trinity College, Dublin.

He represented Tralee from 1717 to 1727.
