= William Fletcher (Irish judge) =

Irish barrister, politician and judge

William Fletcher (1750–1823) was an Irish barrister, politician and judge. He sat in the Irish House of Commons and became a justice of the Court of Common Pleas (Ireland). He was a man of strong opinions, which were forcefully expressed. He felt especially strongly about the condition of Ireland in his time, and a highly political address he delivered to a grand jury in 1814 caused much controversy and public comment.

== The Fletcher family ==
He was the son of George Fletcher and Mary Meyler, eldest daughter of Stephen Meyler. He was born in Dublin, but the principal family residence was at Garr, near Rhode, County Offaly, and his father also had an estate at Clane in County Kildare. William himself later bought a house on Merrion Square in Dublin city centre, and an estate at Donnybrook, south of Dublin city.

The Fletchers of Garr, who came to Ireland from Scotland in the 1690s, were a junior branch of the well-known Fletcher family of Saltoun, East Lothian, which had already produced two distinguished Scottish judges, Andrew Fletcher, Lord Innerpeffer (died 1650), and Andrew Fletcher, Lord Milton (1692–1766).

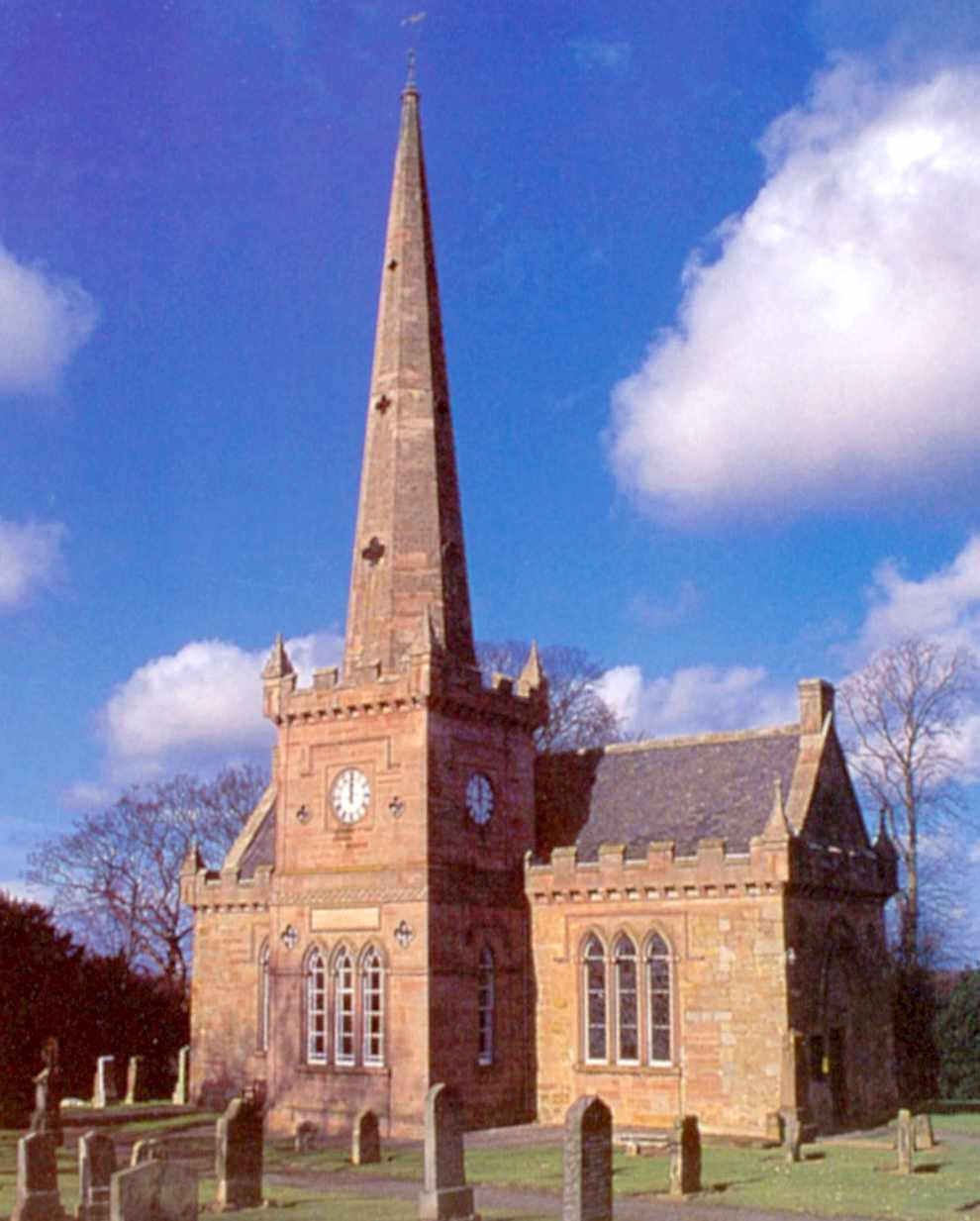
Saltoun, East Lothian, Scotland, where the Fletcher family originated

== Early career ==
William was educated at Trinity College Dublin, graduating BA in 1770, entered the Middle Temple in 1776, and was called to the Bar in 1778, taking silk in 1795. He also took a degree in medicine, though there is no evidence that he ever intended to practice as a medical doctor. His legal practice was mainly in the fields of probate and admiralty law. He entered politics, and was elected MP for Tralee in 1795, serving until 1798. He was appointed to the Common Pleas in 1806.

== Charge to the Wexford Grand Jury 1814 ==
Though in theory he had sat as an opposition MP, he had never during his years in the House of Commons made a speech which caused the Government any serious trouble. Ironically it was as a judge that he earned a reputation for strong political views. This was most notable in his charge to a grand jury in County Wexford at the summer Assizes in 1814, where the jurors were treated to a fiery oration on all the evils afflicting the nation. Some of these evils- absentee landlords, tithes and excessive drunkenness- were familiar enough targets for reformers. More controversially, Fletcher violently attacked the Orange Order. The Orange societies, he said "have produced the most mischievous effects... they poison the very fountains of justice, and even magistrates under their influence, have, in too many instances, violated their duty and their oaths".

The charge caused a sensation, and the published version went through numerous editions. It was greeted with uproar from the Orange Societies, and a petition was presented to the House of Commons for an inquiry into Fletcher's conduct. However the judge had admirers as well as critics: one periodical praised "the aged and benevolent judge"; and the controversy eventually died away. Fletcher remained on the Bench till his death, which occurred in 1823 at his home at Montrose, Donnybrook, Dublin.

== Marriage and children ==
He married Sarah Whitly of Portlaoise in 1780, and had one son, also named William. The younger William married Francesca, youngest daughter of the leading United Irishman, Archibald Hamilton Rowan, and his wife Sarah Dawson, and had issue. He died in 1845, and his widow in 1861.

== Sources ==
- Charge of the Hon. Mr. Justice Fletcher to the Grand Jury of the County of Wexford at the Summer Assizes 1814
- Ball, F. Elrington The Judges in Ireland 1221–1921 London John Murray 1926
- Burke, Bernard Landed Gentry of Ireland London Harrisons 1858
- Monthly Review Volume 80 London 1816
