= Gorey (Parliament of Ireland constituency) =

Pre-1801 Irish constituency

- Former borough constituency for the Irish House of Commons
- County: County Wexford
- Borough: Gorey

1620–1801
- Replaced by: Disfranchised

Gorey (also known as Newborough) was a constituency represented in the Irish House of Commons until its abolition on 1 January 1801.

== History ==
In the Patriot Parliament of 1689 summoned by James II, Gorey was represented with two members.

== Members of Parliament, 1620–1801 ==
- 1634–1635: Sir Adam Loftus and Roger Lorte
- 1639–1649: Sir Adam Loftus and William Plunkett
- 1661–1666: Sir Walter Plunkett and John Kichiugman

=== 1689–1801 ===
Election	First MP	Second MP
1689	Abraham Strange	Richard Daly
1692	John Itchingham Chichester	Abel Ram
1713	Sir John Stanley, 1st Bt	George Ram
1715	Abel Ram	George Ram
1727	Abel Ram	Abel Ram
1741	Humphreys Ram	Abel Ram
1761	Stephen Trotter	Abel Ram
1764	Stephen Ram	Abel Ram
1776	Stephen Ram	Humphreys Ram
1781	Stephen Ram	William Ogilvie
1783	Stephen Ram	Richard Vowell
1790	Charles Stanley Monck	John Toler
1798	William Domville Stanley Monck	John Toler
1799	Joseph Mason Ormsby	John Toler
1801	Disenfranchised	

== Bibliography ==
- O'Hart, John (2007). The Irish and Anglo-Irish Landed Gentry: When Cromwell came to Ireland. Vol. II. Heritage Books. ISBN 978-0-7884-1927-0.
- Leigh Rayment's historical List of Members of the Irish House of Commons. Cites: Johnston-Liik, Edith Mary (2002). The History of the Irish Parliament 1692-1800 (6 volumes). Ulster Historical Foundation.
