= Sir William Godfrey, 1st Baronet =

Anglo-Irish member of the Irish House of Commons

Sir William Godfrey, 1st Baronet (1739–1817) was an Anglo-Irish member of the Irish House of Commons.

Godfrey was the son of John Godfrey, Esquire and Barbara, the daughter of Reverend Hathway. He was a great-grandson of Thomas Coningsby, 1st Earl Coningsby and his family owned a sizeable estate in County Kerry.

He served as High Sheriff of Kerry in 1780. He was Member of Parliament for Tralee between 1785 and 1790. On 17 June 1785, he was created a baronet, of Bushfield in County Kerry. He subsequently served as MP for Belfast between 1792 and 1797. Godfrey rebuilt the family home at Bushfield House near Milltown, County Kerry, renaming it Kicolman Abbey in reference to the family's ownership of Killagha Abbey.

Godfrey married Agnes, the only daughter of William Blennerhassett, on 15 August 1761. Together they had nine children. He was succeeded in his titles by his eldest son, John.

Baronetage of Ireland
New creation	Baronet (of Bushfield); 1785–1817	Succeeded by John Godfrey
Parliament of Ireland
Preceded by Thomas Lloyd; John Toler	Member of Parliament for Tralee; 1777–1783; With: John Toler	Succeeded by Crosbie Morgell; Boyle Roche
