= Dyrham Park Country Club =

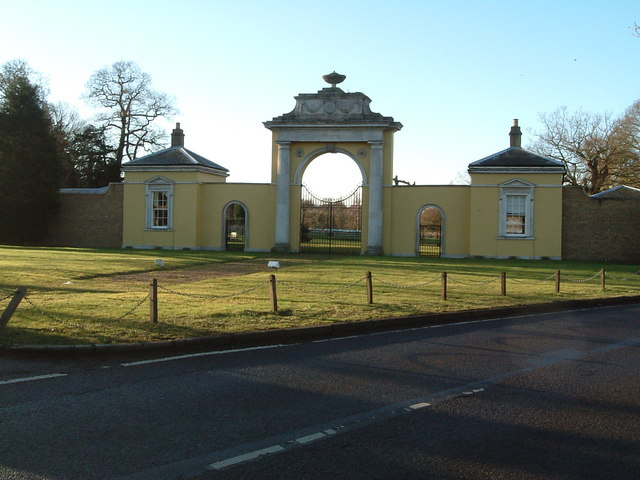
- Dyrham Park, Entrance Gateway

- Location within Hertfordshire

General information
- Type: Palladian mansion
- Location: Near Borehamwood, Hertfordshire, England
- Coordinates: 51°40′31″N 0°13′11″W

Dyrham Park Country Club is a country house, estate and golf club in Hertfordshire, England, near Dancers Hill, several miles northeast of Borehamwood, and to the north of Barnet. It is a white Palladian mansion, set in two hundred acres, with an 18-hole golf course, adjacent to The Shire London Golf Club. The estate was originally settled as a manor in Elizabethan times and the current Palladian mansion was built in the 19th century. The house was renovated in the 1960s and the golf course was established in 1963. The house has been listed Grade II on the National Heritage List for England since May 1949.

== Golf ==
In its history it has hosted numerous championships, including the 1974 JNF pro-am golf tournament, featuring 136 golfers. Due to its close proximity to Elstree Studios it has been extensively used as a filming location for numerous TV series and films, including The Saint, The Avengers and "The Smile Behind the Veil" episode of Randall and Hopkirk (Deceased) in the 1960s and films such as The Strange World of Planet X (1957), The Devil's Disciple (1959) and The Secret of My Success (1965). A lake is located in the grounds. Until 1965, the house and park lay in Middlesex. The entrance gates are listed Grade II*.
