= Richard Underwood =

Irish Anglican priest

Richard Underwood was a 17th-century Anglican priest in Ireland.

Underwood was Precentor of Ferns and Dean of Lismore from 1661 until his death in 1664.
