= Durrow Abbey =

Historic site in Durrow, County Offaly, Ireland

Coordinates: 53°19′33″N 7°31′11″W

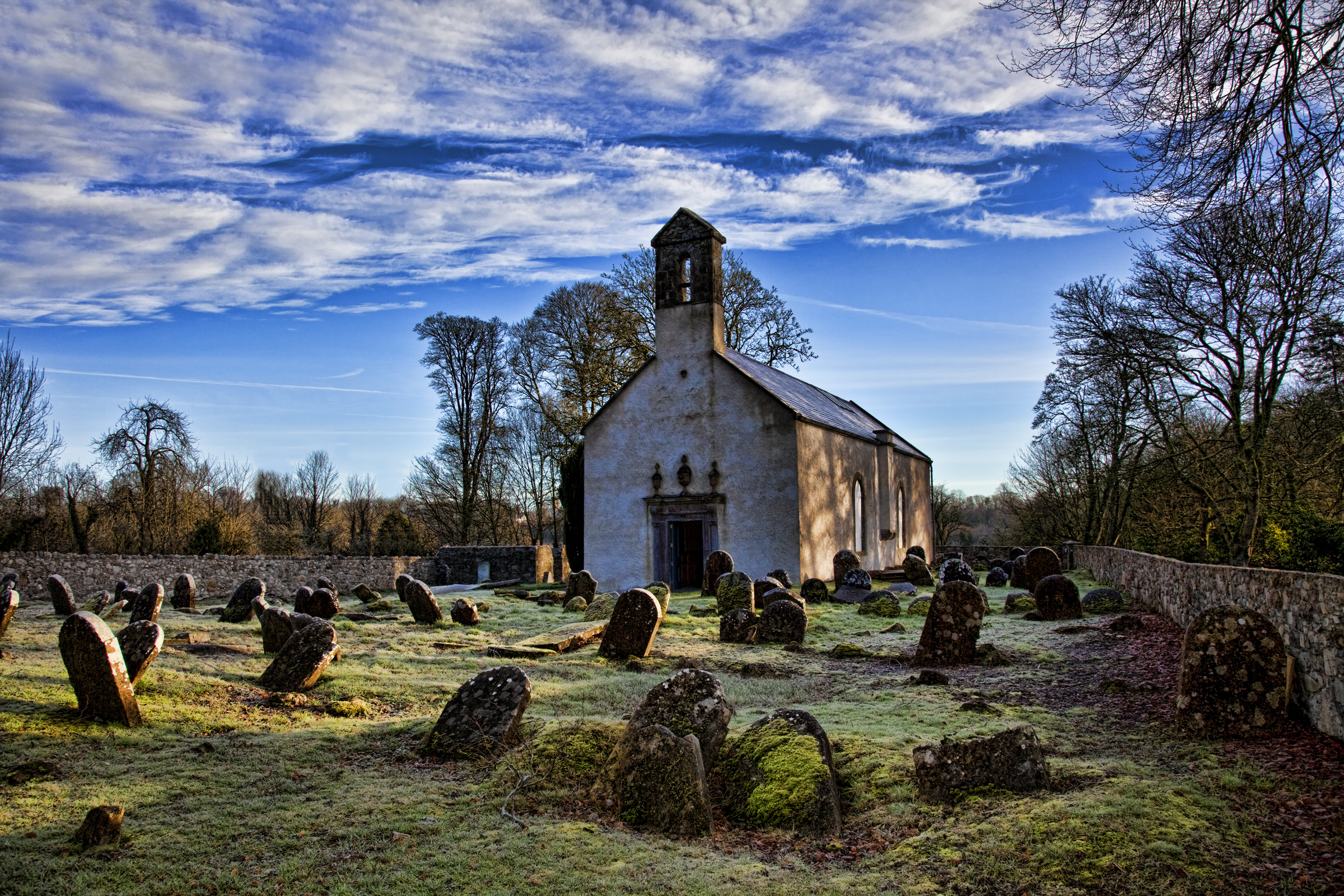
- Durrow Abbey in 2013
- Interactive map of Durrow Abbey

Monastery information
- Established: 580s

People
- Founder: Saint Columba

Architecture
- Heritage designation: National Monument

Site
- Location: Near
- Public access: Yes

Durrow Abbey is a historic site in Durrow, County Offaly in Ireland. It is 5 kilometres (3 mi) north of the centre of Tullamore (8 kilometres (5 mi) via the N52 road). Largely undisturbed, the site is an early medieval monastic complex of ecclesiastical and secular monuments, visible and sub-surface.

Durrow was probably founded by Columba around the 550s, and during his life and for centuries after was a well known centre of education. The Venerable Bede called it Monasterium nobile in Hiberniâ, and, at a later period, Armagh and Durrow were called the "Universities of the West". Durrow, like Clonard, Derry, and most other monasteries in the area, was frequently ravaged by the Vikings, but was not completely destroyed until the Norman invasion.

The famous illuminated manuscript Book of Durrow, now at Trinity College, Dublin, was at the abbey by 916 at the latest, although it may have been made elsewhere. Discovered in the hands of a local farmer after the Reformation, the book is regarded as the earliest surviving fully decorated Insular Gospel book. It is believed to date from the 7th or 8th century, though the date is a matter of long-standing controversy.

The extant monuments at the site include a large ecclesiastical enclosure, five Early Christian grave slabs, a mid-ninth century high cross, a fragment of a cross shaft, a complete cross-head (now in the National Museum of Ireland) and cross base, a holy well and other archaeological features. The Anglo-Norman Hugh de Lacy, Lord of Meath built a motte at the abbey in 1180, using the stones, and was killed at the abbey in 1186 by an Irishman, one of his workmen. Remarkably, the site saw a second murder of an earl in 1839, when Hector John Graham-Toler, 2nd Earl of Norbury was shot "by an assassin, in his own plantation".

== History ==
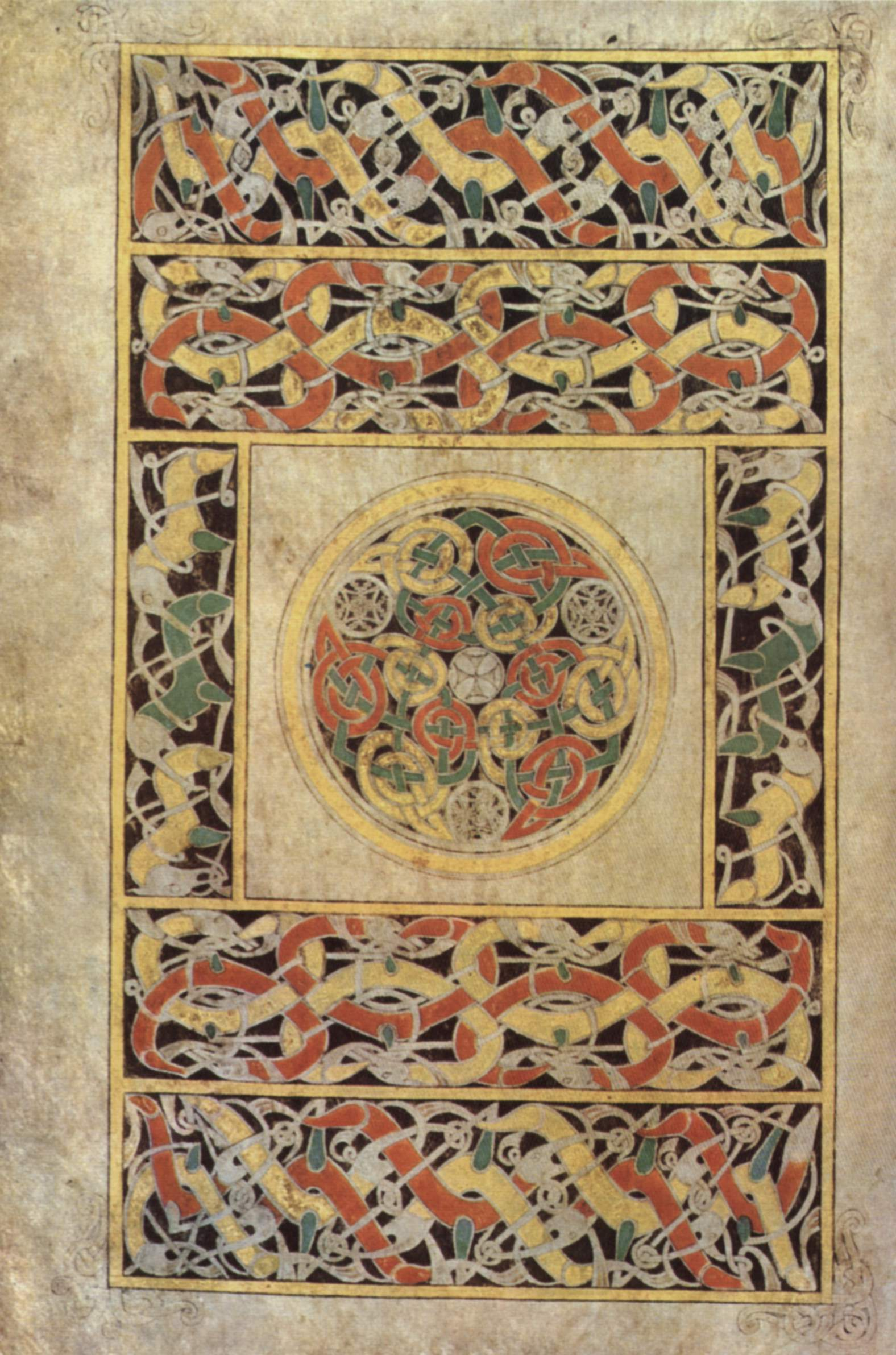
Carpet page with interlaced animals from the Book of Durrow

Durrow was probably founded by Columba in the 580s. In the Vita Columbae, Laisrén, who would become the third abbot of Iona, acts as a leader of the monastery. Not much is known about the early history of Durrow, although Bede says it was an important centre from which more monasteries were founded. Durrow appears to have courted the favour of Clann Cholmáin, and in 763 Domnall Midi was apparently buried there. Durrow appears in the Annals for the year 764, where men from the community of Durrow go to battle against those of Clonmacnoise, as part of a Clann Cholmáin succession struggle. The men of Durrow also participated in a raid into Munster alongside Donnchad Midi in 776.

The site itself, originally called Daru (plain of the oaks) is the location of some of the only remaining pre-mediaeval oak in Ireland. The line of oak trees which lines the fields to the side of Durrow Abbey also marks the route of the Slighe Mhór ("Great Highway") along the Esker Riada. The vicinity is Mag Lena, where a synod of Irish clerics was held AD 630 to resolve the controversy over the date of Easter.

From an architectural perspective, the site contains two interesting features: Durrow Abbey House — a building of significant quality dating to the 1920s when it was rebuilt after a fire that left the roof and interior destroyed — the church dating from the late eighteenth/early nineteenth century which itself is built on the footprint of at least one previous church, dating from medieval times. It is also suggested that the medieval church was itself built on the site of a former 12th century abbey church.

=== Astronomical observation ===
In July 1054, according to record in the Annals of the Four Masters, monks in the Durrow Abbey observed a bright star that appeared overnight. Their observation is the only known European sighting of the supernova of 1054. Other known observation in the Eastern world is recorded in Chinese annals.

== Current status ==
In 1992 plans were approved by Offaly County Council for owners Paddy and Sheila O'Brien to develop a golf course, hotel, 46 self-catering chalets and an air strip. The planning permission expired and the development did not proceed.

In 1994 the Church of Ireland handed over St Columba's Church located on the grounds of Durrow Abbey to the State after a dispute about ownership.

In 1998 owner Sheila O'Brien began negotiations with Julie Lowe of the Durrow Abbey Trust to sell the estate for £2 million. Lowe is a descendant of The O'Donnells of Donegal, who are part of the family of St Columba (St Columba founded Durrow in 553 o 556AD). However the deal with Lowe fell through.

In 2000 plans consisting of a hotel, conference centre, leisure and equestrian complex, 461 residential units and a golf course were proposed to be built on the grounds of Durrow Abbey. The council opposed the planning application because of a lack of archaeological information presented with it.

In 2003 the Irish Government bought Durrow Abbey and its accompanying 6th century monastic site at a cost of €3.175 million. The purchase of the sixth century site and part of the historic Durrow Abbey estate was designed to protect the Abbey and heritage elements from proposed commercial development on the lands. The vendor was Sheila O'Brien. The Minister of State at the Office of Public Works, Tom Parlon, described the acquisition as "a true asset in the State's property portfolio".

On 21 May 2007 a 99-year full repair and insure lease on Durrow Abbey House was agreed by the Minister for the Environment, Heritage and Local Government John Gormley and the Arts for Peace Foundation at a peppercorn rate (€10 annual rent). This requires the Foundation, as lessee, to carry out all internal and external repairs/maintenance to the fabric of Durrow Abbey. The Arts for Peace Foundation plans to use the house and grounds as the venue for a recreational respite centre for children from conflict zones.

In December 2016 the Arts for Peace Foundation sued the Office of Public Works for breach of contract alleging a lack of maintenance at Durrow Abbey House. The charity had not used the house since 2013 because of this dispute over repairs. In 2015 Minister of State at the Department of Public Expenditure and Reform Simon Harris stated the lease included an obligation on the tenant to insure and keep the house in good repair and that the charity had not commenced works on the property in line with their stated objective.

On 4 December 2018, John McGuinness, Chair of the Committee on Finance, Public Expenditure and Reform, said meetings were held with the OPW and officials with plans to surrender the lease of Durrow Abbey back to the State for a figure of €600,000.

On 31 December 2018, the abbey house was the venue for a New Year's Eve rave. The rave was organised across six stages with an attendance of approximately 900 people. Elizabeth Garrahy, the director of the Arts for Peace Foundation, said it was a private event not run by the foundation and that the organisers of the rave worked in the grounds of the abbey for two weeks free of charge in exchange for using the property. A second rave was organised through social media to be held in March 2019 but did not proceed "because of the fuss that was made" locally about the New Year's Eve rave, according to the lessee.

In May 2021, Fianna Fáil TD Barry Cowen issued a press release stating the Office of Public Works had repossessed Durrow Abbey house. He said the OPW were on "sound legal ground" based on the lease agreements not being honoured by the Arts for Peace Foundation. The founder of the charity called Gardaí to the premises on Wednesday May 19 alleging the OPW had trespassed on the property. A Garda spokesperson stated Gardai had attended the premises but no offences were disclosed.

== Other De Lacy associated monuments and structures ==
- Fore Abbey
- Delvin Castle
- Trim Castle

== Gallery ==
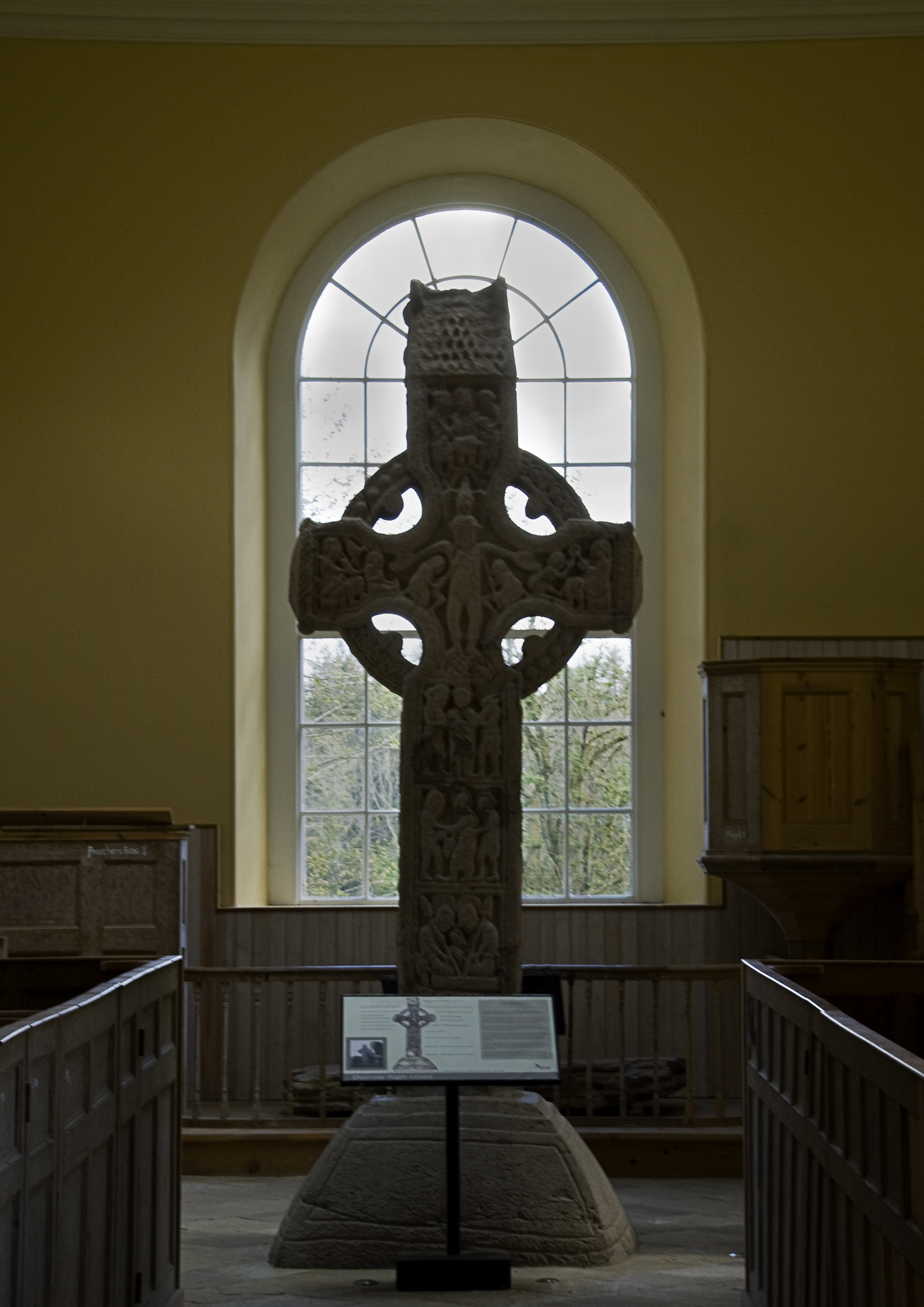
High Cross

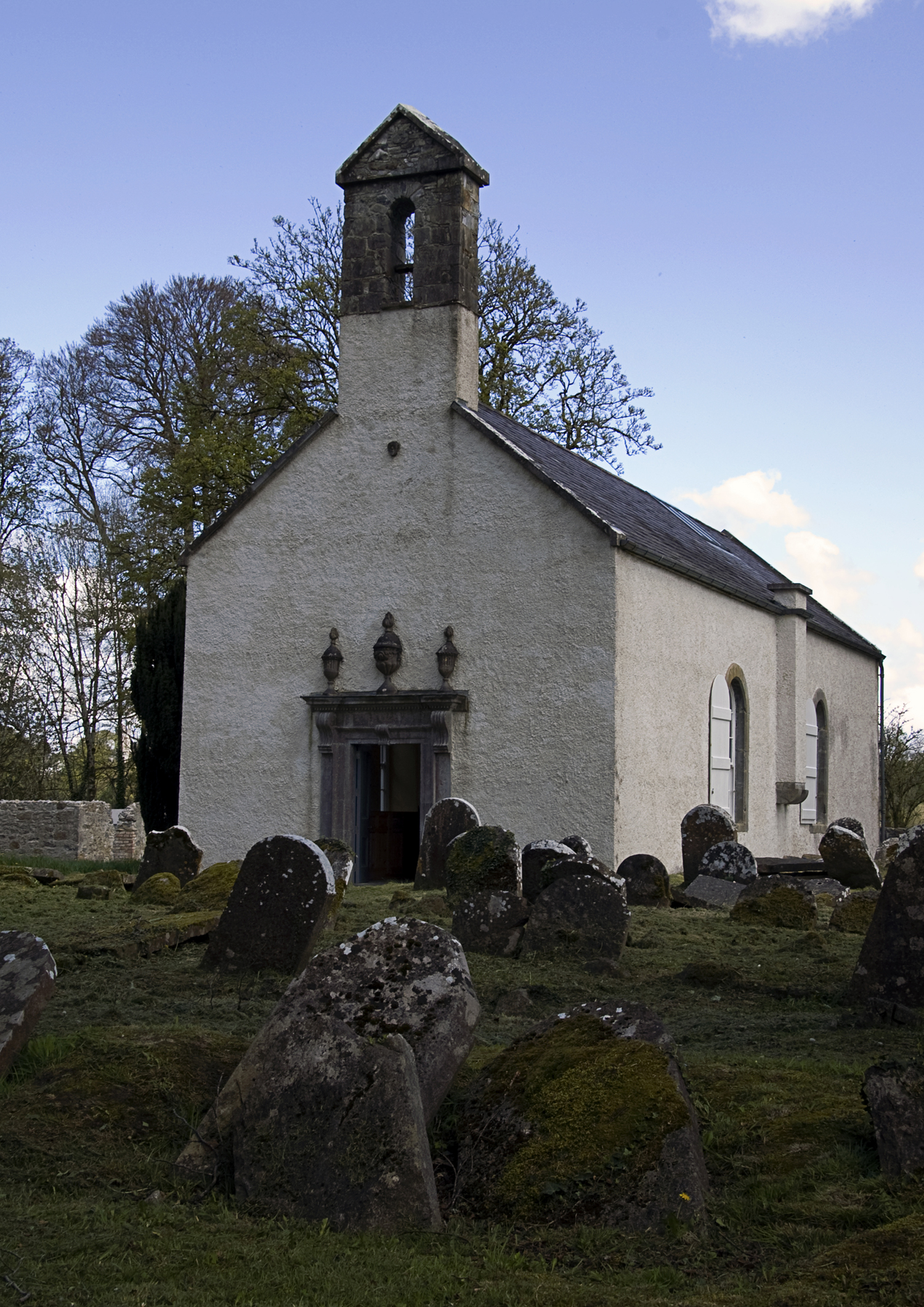
Columcille's Church Exterior

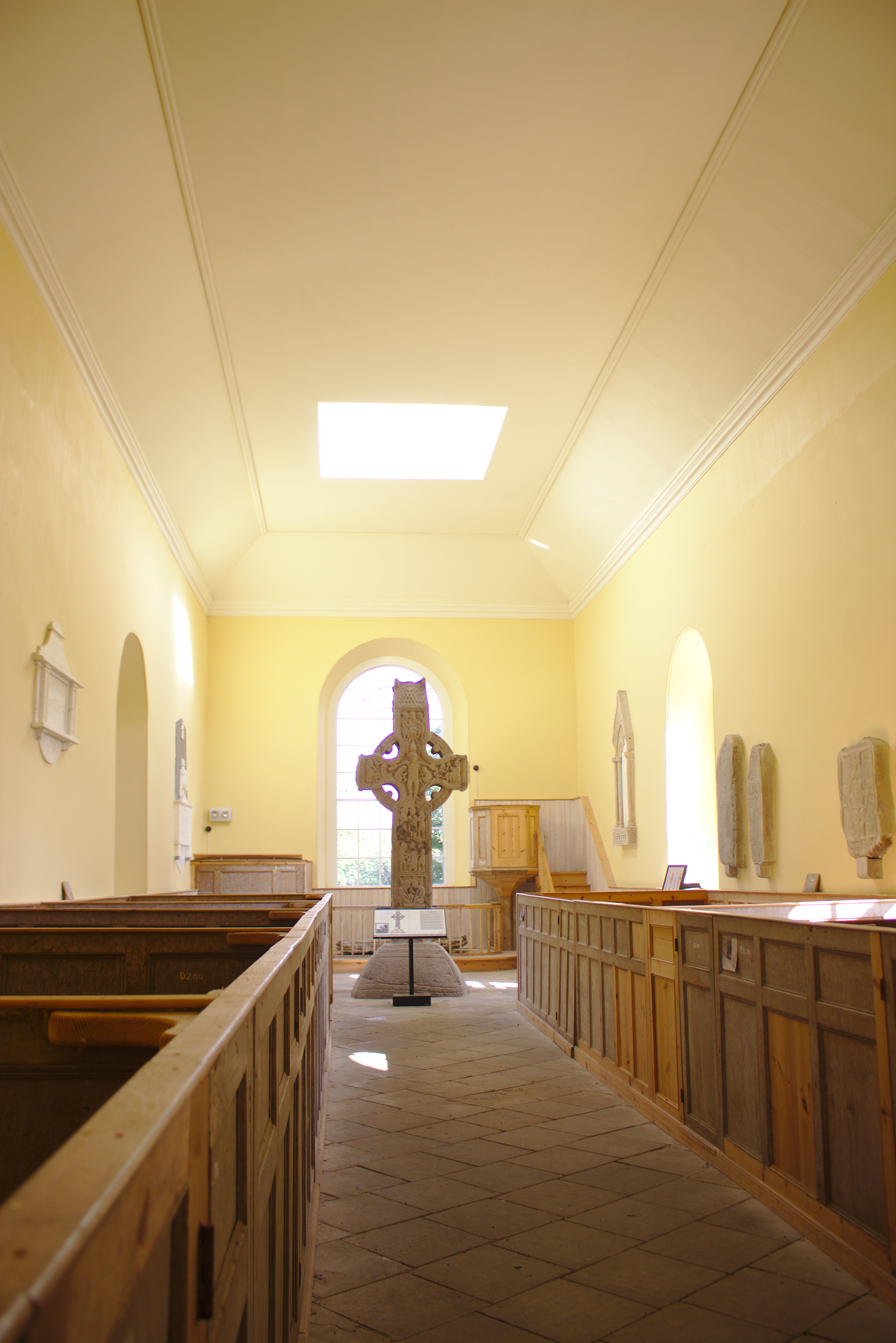
High Cross and church interior

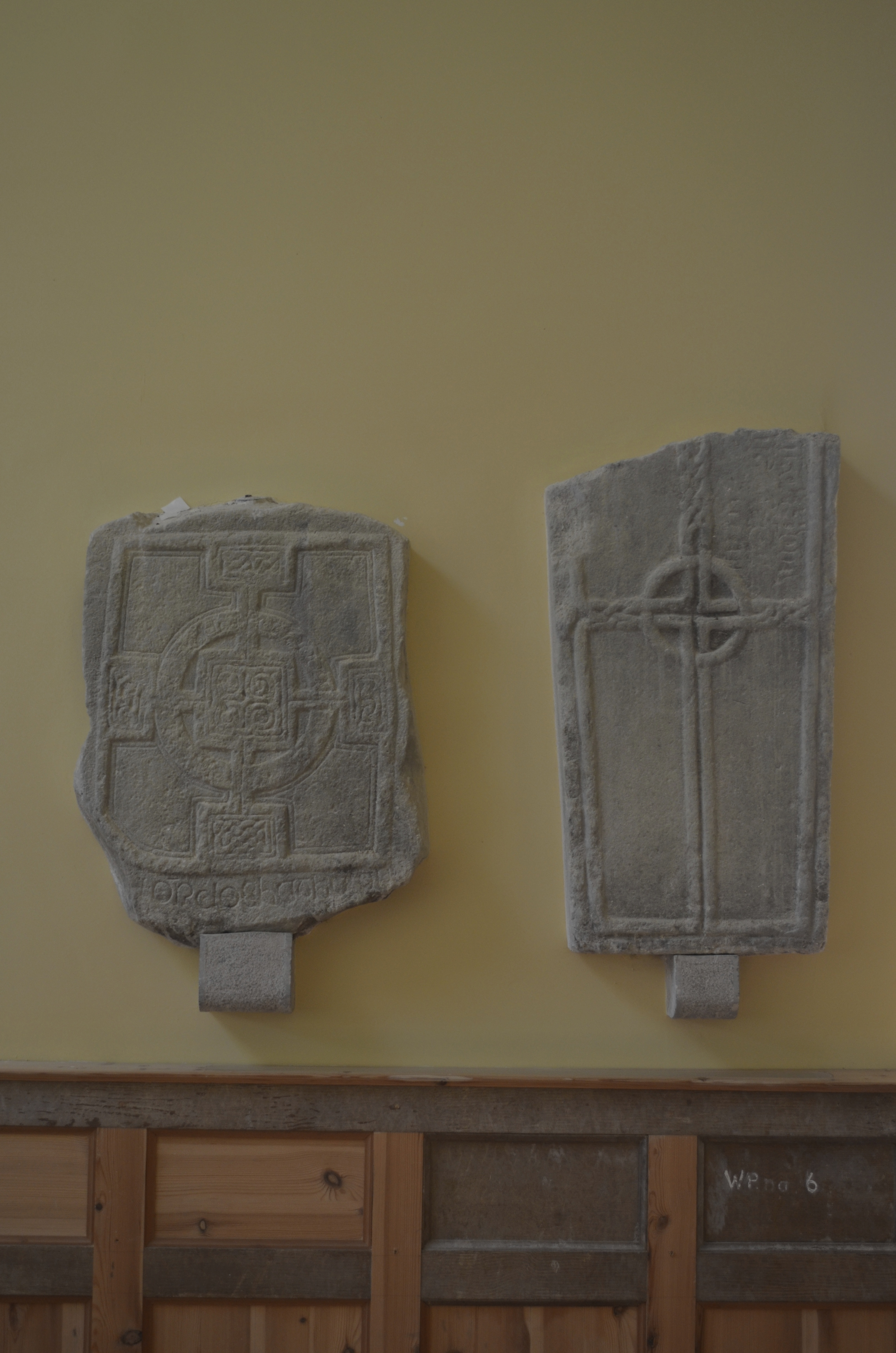
Grave Slabs

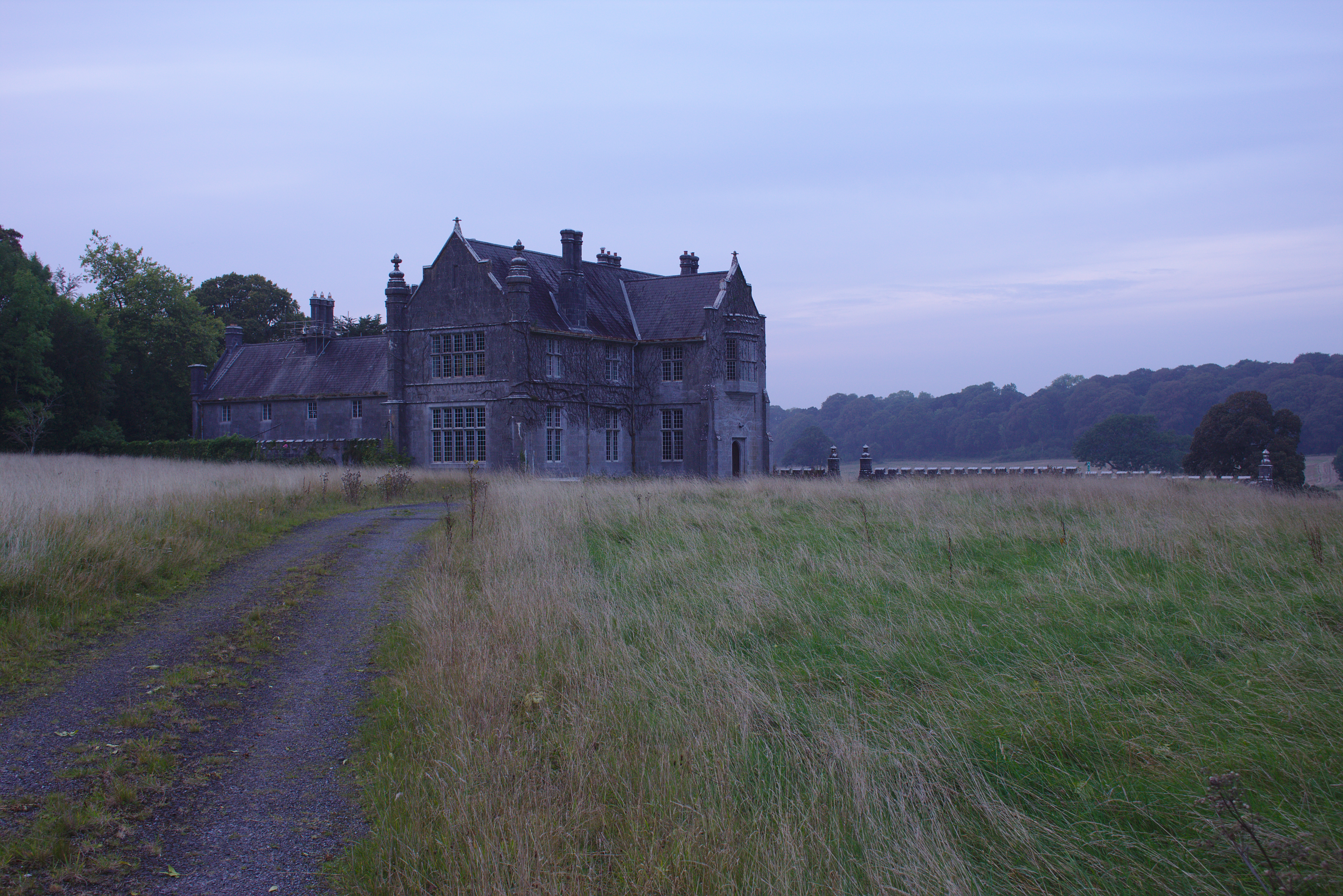
The Abbey House

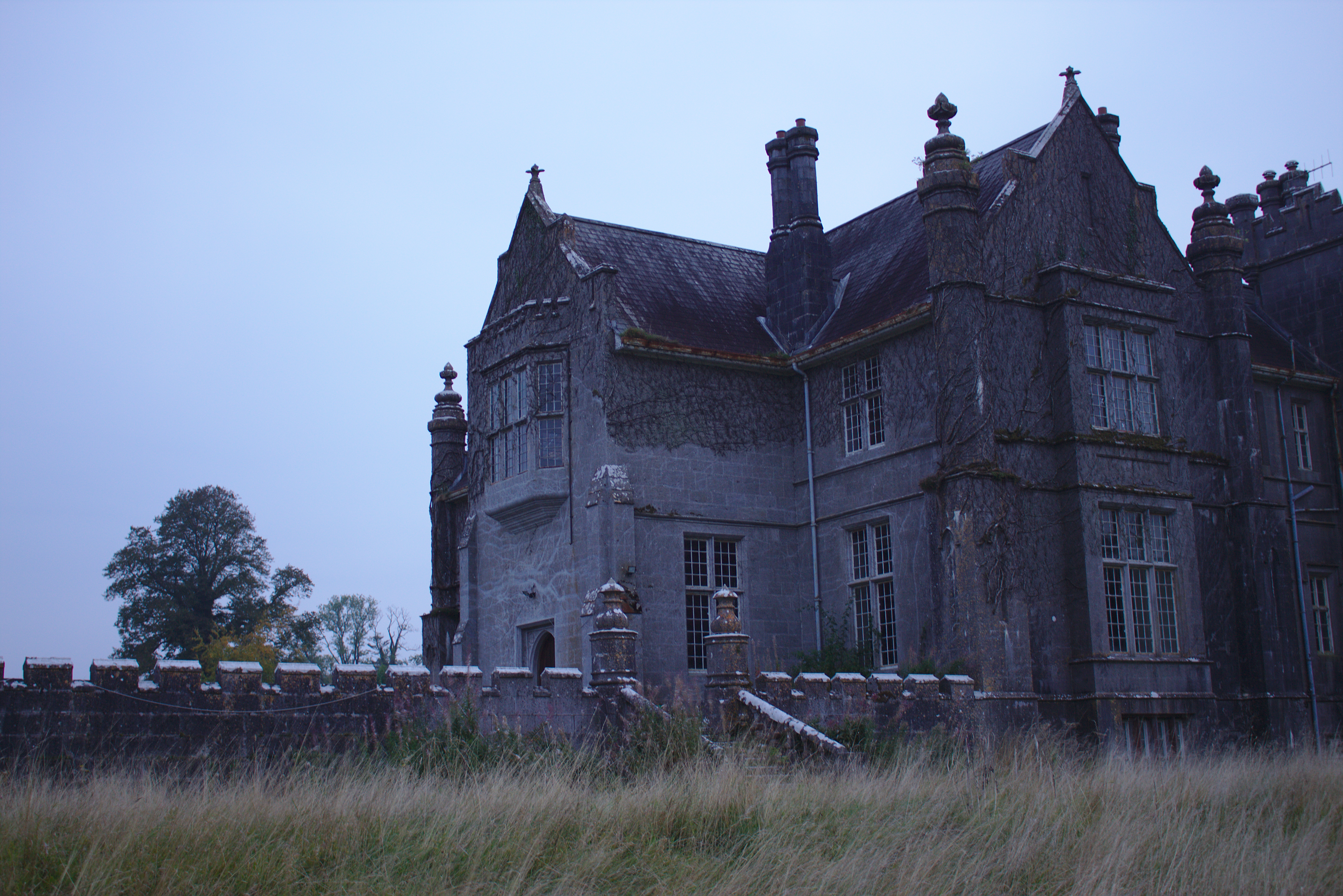
The Abbey House Side View

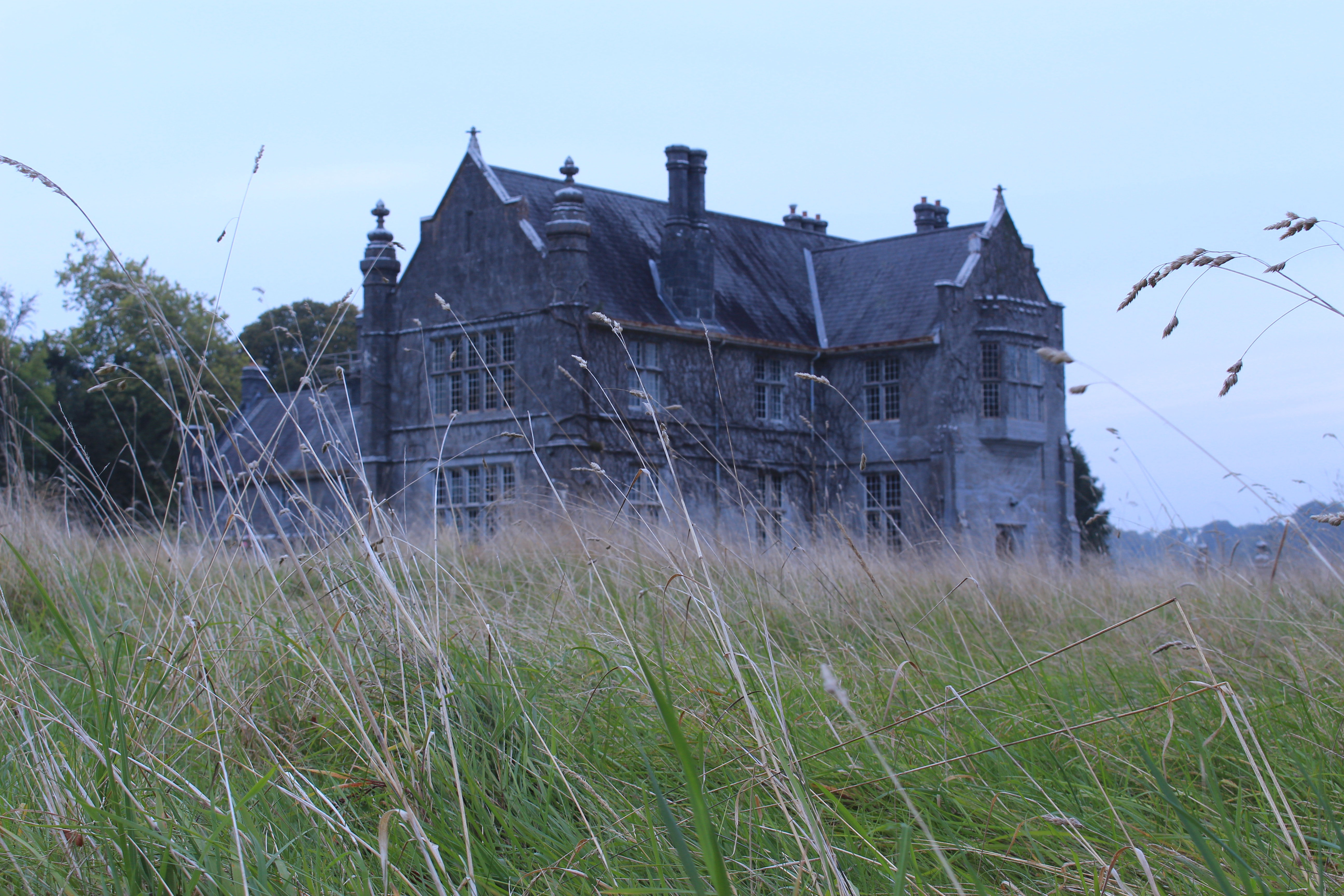
The Abbey

== See also ==
- List of abbeys and priories in Ireland (County Offaly)
