= Knockalton Lower =

Townland in County Tipperary, Ireland

Coordinates: 52.8553°N 8.1531°W

Knockalton Lower (Cnoc Alltáin Íochtarach in Irish) is a townland in the historical Barony of Ormond Upper, County Tipperary, Ireland.

== Location ==
Knockalton Lower is located in north County Tipperary west of Nenagh between the R445 road and the M7 motorway

== Structures of note ==
Knockalton/Lisbunny standing Stone, bordering the townlands of Knockalton Lower and Lisbunny, County Tipperary is of limestone. It is 2.15m in height and 60 to 80cm in width.

Knockalton House is a detached house, built around 1800. The refurbished house along with its outbuildings is listed as being of architectural interest.
