= Boom Hall =

- Location within Northern Ireland

General information
- Status: Unoccupied shell
- Type: Country house
- Architectural style: Georgian; classical
- Location: Derry, Northern Ireland
- Coordinates: 55.0212°N 7.2973°W
- Named for: A boom installed on the River Foyle during the Siege of Derry
- Completed: Circa 1779
- Owner: Derry City and Strabane District Council

Technical details
- Material: Schist rubble walls faced with sandstone
- Floor count: Two storeys plus basement
- Grounds: 30 acres (12 ha)

Design and construction
- Architect: Michael Priestly

Boom Hall is a house and demesne in Derry, Northern Ireland. Lying close to the west bank of the River Foyle, a fort was constructed on the site during the English Civil War. During the Williamite War in Ireland a boom was constructed across the river to try to prevent Williamite forces relieving the Siege of Derry. A two-storey country house was subsequently built on the site by the Alexander family and named after this boom. The estate was later leased to a number of people until a leasehold was sold to Daniel Baird in 1849 by The 3rd Earl of Caledon. This was inherited by Daniel Baird Maturin-Baird who also purchased the freehold from the Alexanders. Boom Hall was again let to a number of different people, with Michael Henry McDevitt living there from 1924. During the Second World War, the demesne was used by the Admiralty and a number of temporary huts were built there. McDevitt purchased the freehold in 1949 and the house was renovated. It fell into disuse in the 1960s and was almost destroyed by fire in the 1970s. Part of the estate was used for the construction of the Foyle Bridge.

The property was purchased by Derry City Council in 1997 though it remains a fenced-off shell. There are two current proposals to renovate the house; one as part of a recreational park described as being in the style of the Eden Project, and one as a community hub for outdoor activities. The council is developing a redevelopment brief that will seek to partner with one or more parties to redevelop the site.

== Early history ==
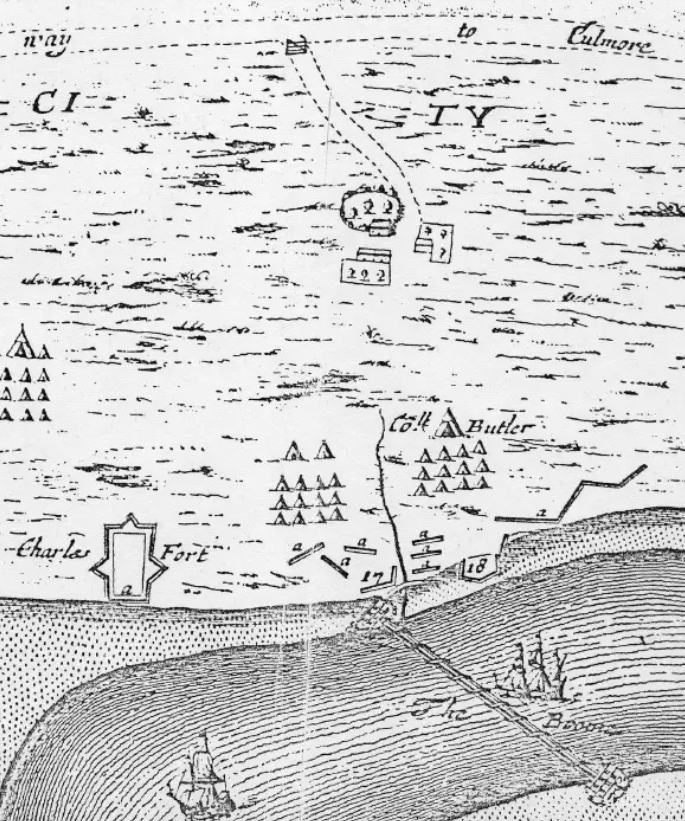
Boom and Fort Charles in 1689, including the site of Boom Hall

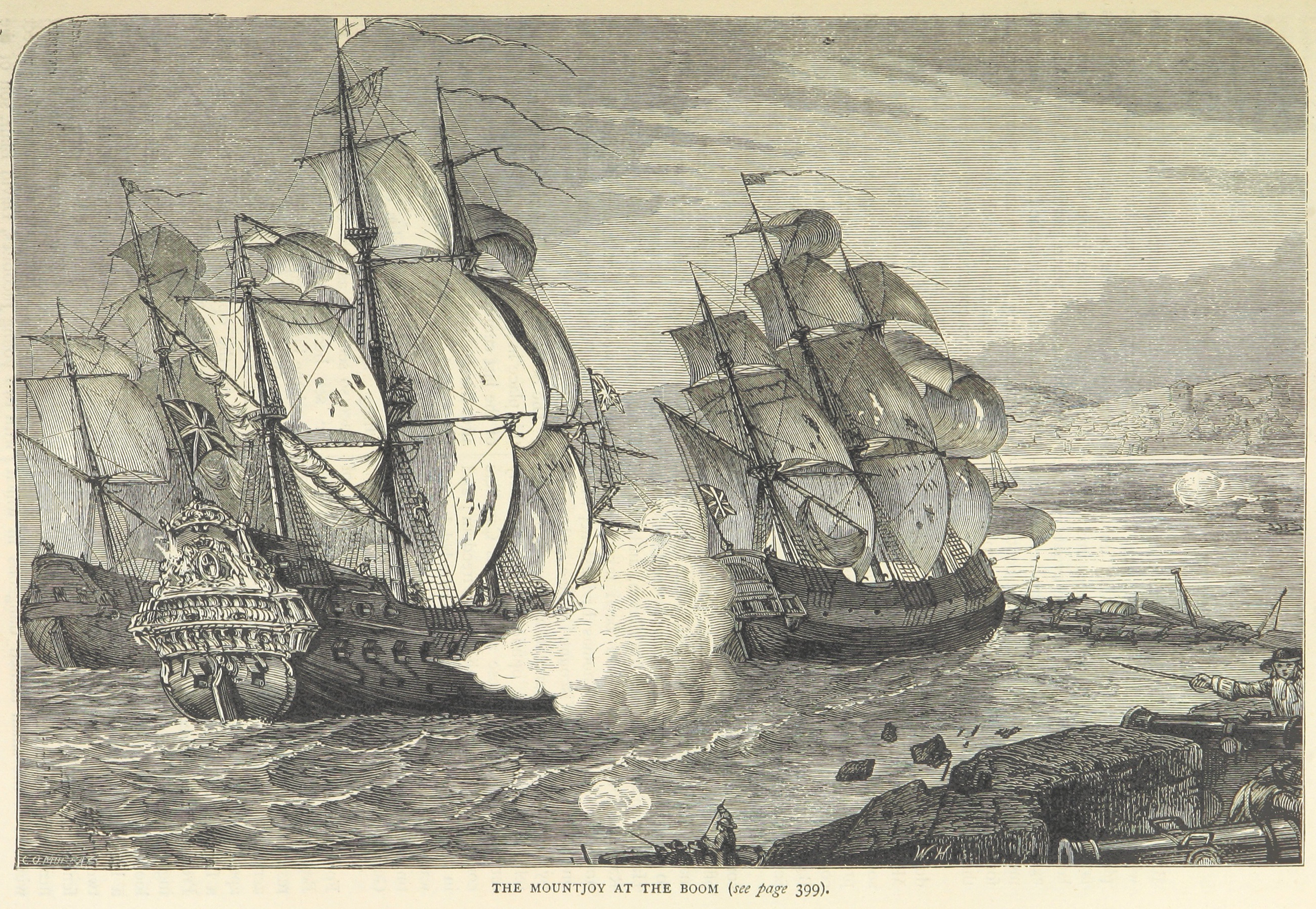
Breaching of the boom, 1689

The Boom Hall Demesne borders the River Foyle in western County Londonderry. It extends from the river north west to the Culmore Road. The land, which is underlain with schistose grits and pelitic schists of the Upper Dalradian Londonderry Formation, slopes gradually towards the river. The ground falls away steeply, over a 35 metres (38 yd) width, at the river's edge.

Excavations on the site found three flint flakes that suggest the site may have been occupied during the Mesolithic or Neolithic eras. The site came into the ownership of the Catholic Abbey of Derry but as part of the Plantation of Ulster was granted to The Honourable The Irish Society. During the English Civil War a royalist stronghold, Charles Fort, was constructed on the estate in 1649. It was twice unsuccessfully besieged by Parliamentarian forces.

In 1688, during the Williamite War in Ireland, Charles Fort was occupied by Jacobite forces as part of the Siege of Derry. To try to prevent Williamite forces from relieving the siege a boom was constructed across the River Foyle to prevent the passage of ships. The boom extended from Fort Charles to a new fort constructed on the opposite bank and the Boom Hall estate housed some of the Jacobite forces. A Williamite force successfully breached the boom in 1689 and relieved the defenders of Derry.

A 2.5-metre (8.2 ft)-long rough-dressed stone pier that lies near the lawn of the modern Boom Hall may have been an anchor point for the boom. In 1887 a gardener found a 17th-century sword and gun buried beneath an apple tree on the estate that apparently relate to action at the boom.

== Alexander family ==
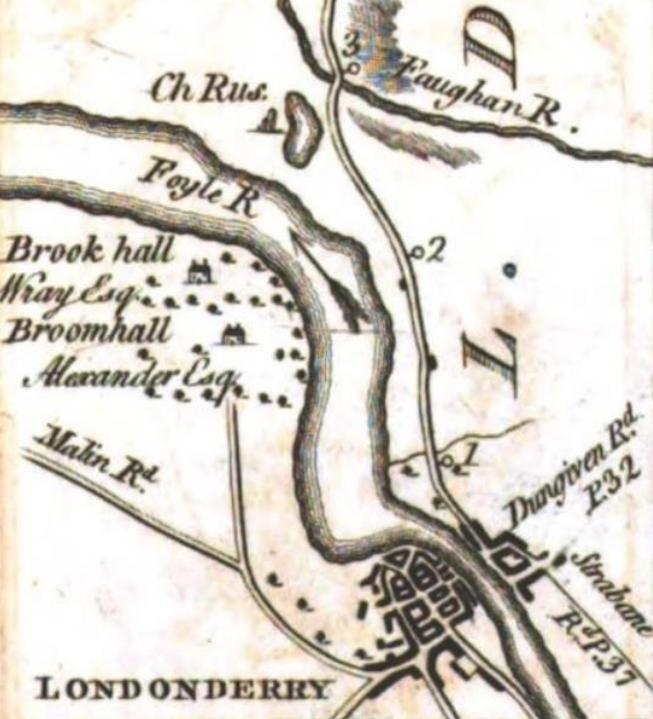
Boom Hall from Taylor and Skinner’s road map of Londonderry, 1777

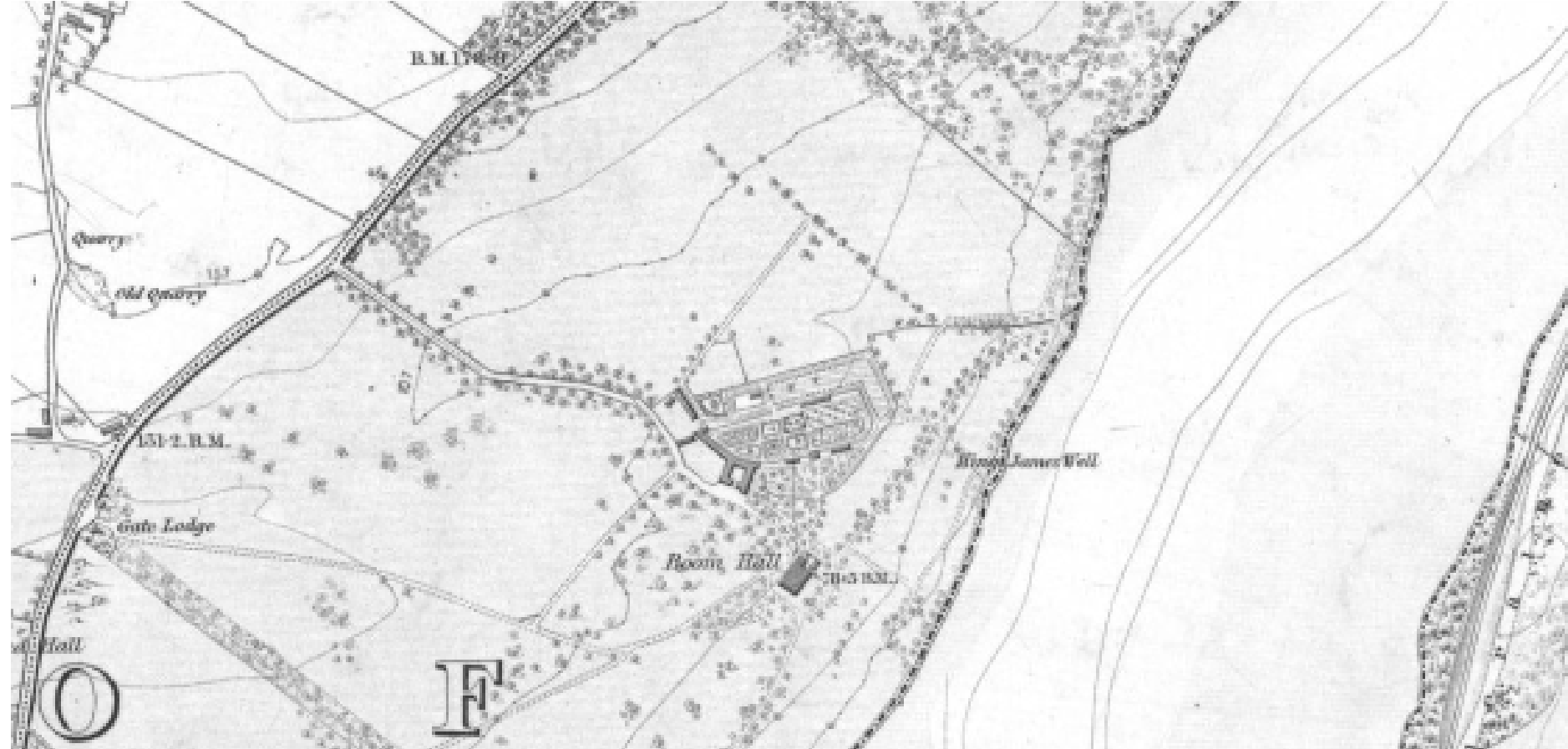
Boom Hall from the 2nd Edition Ordnance Survey of Ireland 1860

Some time after the siege the estate was purchased by the Alexander family. It is possible that the estate was Gunsland, an Alexander-owned estate in County Londonderry, though some sources place this estate in County Donegal. The surviving structure dates from circa 1779 but an earlier hall may have been built on the site by the family, some distance to the north of the current structure (beneath the current walled garden). A curving ha-ha on the site is probably associated with this hall and dates to the 18th-century. The early hall probably had formal gardens, the remains of which are discernible on aerial photographs and an old map. The estate and hall became known as Boom Hall after the 1689 engagement. The Alexander family enlarged the estate between 1765 and 1775 by buying adjacent plots of land.

James Alexander returned from India in the 1770s, having made a fortune during his time with the Honourable East India Company. He ordered the current hall which was designed by architect Michael Priestly. Priestly died in 1777 and it is possible that the builder made alterations to his plans during construction as the interior rooms are unusual for their varied sizes. The hall was constructed in the Georgian and classical styles and overlooks the river. The hall is two storeys and rectangular with the entrance on the north-western face. A basement forms a third storey on the rear of the house, due to the sloping ground. The front face is formed of seven bays, with a central breakfront of three bays including a Tuscan columned porch. The porch, reached by a flight of steps, is a later addition and the original entrance may have been on the south-eastern face where there is a full height canted bay and a stone pediment survives over the central ground-floor window. The side faces have five bays and the roof was hipped.

The walls of the hall are formed of schist rubble, faced with cut sandstone, with the basement being constructed of vaulted brick-work. The entrance opens in a wide stone-flagged hall from which doors led to the main rooms. The stairs were located to the left of the entrance. In the late 20th-century it was recorded that the drawing room had shutters and a chair rail but no other features of note in the other rooms survived. The basement contained a Regency-style cast-iron kitchen range with laurel detailing. The two-storey stable block pre-dates the current hall but may have also been designed by Priestly.

At the time of the hall's construction the estate was also remodelled in a more naturalistic style, which was fashionable at that time. A tree-lined drive led from the Culmore Road to the hall, with a second avenue forming a circuit around landscaped parkland. A belt of trees delineated the south-western edge of the estate and a cinder path led from the hall to the river. The walled garden was probably also constructed during the remodelling of the estate and is certainly pre-1830.

James Alexander rose in social status after he was created Baron Caledon in 1790 (after Caledon, County Tyrone, where he owned an estate), Viscount Caledon in 1797 and Earl of Caledon in 1800. Alexander did not live at Boom Hall, building Caledon Castle in Caledon in the south-east of County Tyrone as his seat, but allowed his younger brother Robert, a Derry merchant, to live there. A gate on the Culmore Road, that survives to the present, was probably a second access point added by the Alexanders in the 1830s-1850s as part of a one-way system through the estate to reduce congestion during large gatherings at the house. This could have been the last major works carried out by the family to the estate, though a bay was also added to the north-east side of the house sometime before 1856. In the later years of Alexander ownership, the house was let to a number of tenants. These included Thomas Gough, Dean of Derry, and, in 1837, Richard Ponsonby, the Church of Ireland Bishop of Derry and Raphoe.

== Later history ==
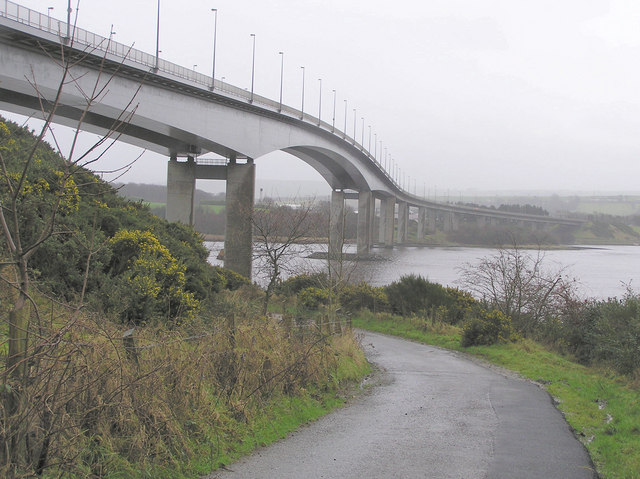
Foyle Bridge; the pathway under the bridge leads to Boom Hall

The 3rd Earl of Caledon sold a leasehold on the property to Daniel Baird in 1849, and a family history states this was to finance the purchase of slums in the city and their replacement by new houses. After Baird's death, the leasehold came into the ownership of Daniel Baird Maturin-Baird, though he later acquired the freehold on the property he never lived there. Maturin-Baird let Boom Hall to shipping company owners John and Joseph Cooke who lived there until 1883. Sir John Barr Johnston, a Mayor of Derry, was a tenant in 1903, and James Corscaden, a ship owner, also lived there for a period. Joseph Cooke's son resided at Boom Hall until his death in 1923.

In 1924 the estate was inherited by Charles Edgar Maturin-Baird who leased it to Michael Henry McDevitt. During the Second World War the property was used by the Admiralty, who built several Quonset huts to house Royal Navy and Women's Royal Naval Service personnel. The property was sold to McDevitt in 1949 who carried out renovations. It was inherited by McDevitt's daughter but suffered neglect during the 1960s and a major fire, that almost destroyed the house, in the 1970s. In the early 1980s, the demesne was bisected by the construction of the Foyle Bridge and associated Madam's Bank Road.

The property lay abandoned until 1997 when it was purchased from the McDevitt family by Derry City Council, though the demolition rights are owned by another party. In recent times the property has continued to decline and is now fenced off, the surviving gate and boundary walls are derelict and encroached by housing. The northern portion of the demesne was sold in 2001 and Foyle Hospice built on the site. The remainder was sub-divided into fields and used to graze horses; some 30 acres (12 ha) remain associated with the house. The demesne holds some of Derry's oldest oak trees and is "home to the biggest concentration of heritage trees in the city"; in 2018, volunteers planted an additional 500 trees to help screen the property. The council's greenway network has been extended under Foyle Bridge which has brought more visitors to the demesne.

An archaeological excavation was carried out in 2013 but it found that much evidence of the 17th-century military activity on the site was probably lost during the 18th-century landscaping works, Second World War development and the construction of Foyle Bridge. In October 2020 there were fears that the remaining shell of Boom Hall was close to collapse and very few internal features remain. The house has never been listed.

== Redevelopment proposals ==
Boom Hall is currently little more than a shell but is said to be salvageable. The current owners, Derry City and Strabane District Council, estimate that it would cost £7-800,000 to structurally stabilise the hall, stables and walled garden. Two charitable trusts have separately proposed redevelopment plans for the site. The Foyle River Gardens Trust (FRGT) has proposed a £45 million Eden Project-style redevelopment that would include river trails, gardens, treetop walkways, rope bridges and zip wires. The FRGT would also restore the hall and bring it back into use. The Boom Hall Trust (BHT), a group of local planners, architects and surveyors, proposed in October 2020 that the hall remain in public ownership but be restored and turned into a community space. The BHT propose that the hall should a focal point for outdoor activities with the wider demesne left in a more natural condition and designated as a local nature reserve.

Doubts have been raised over whether the two trusts could co-operate to restore the site. The council is currently working to produce a redevelopment brief ahead of seeking to partner with one or more parties to redevelop the site.

== Bibliography ==
- "Vol. III.—No. 11. Friday, January 23, 1903". The New Irish Jurist and Local Government Review. 3: 72. 1902. ISSN 2565-5566. JSTOR 44514589.
- MacDonald, Philip; McAlister, Grace (2012). "Archaeological Investigations of the Seventeenth-century Military Landscape at Boom Hall, County Londonderry". Ulster Journal of Archaeology. 71: 150–165. ISSN 0082-7355.
- Ordnance Survey of the County of Londonderry. Dublin: Hodges and Smith. 1837.
- Wasson, Ellis (2017). "List of Parliamentary Families". The British and Irish Ruling Class 1660-1945. Vol. 1. De Gruyter. pp. 5–822. doi:10.1515/9783110548372-006. JSTOR j.ctvbkk18g.8.
