= Eric Alexander =

Eric Alexander may refer to:

- Eric Alexander (jazz saxophonist) (born 1968), American jazz saxophonist
- Eric Alexander (American football) (born 1982), American football linebacker
- Eric Alexander (footballer) (born 1960), Scottish footballer
- Eric Alexander (soccer) (born 1988), American soccer player
- Eric Alexander, 5th Earl of Caledon (1885–1968), soldier

== See also ==
- Erik K. Alexander, American medical educator
