= Du Pré Alexander, 2nd Earl of Caledon =

Irish politician and colonial administrator (1777–1839)

The Right Honourable The Earl of Caledon KP
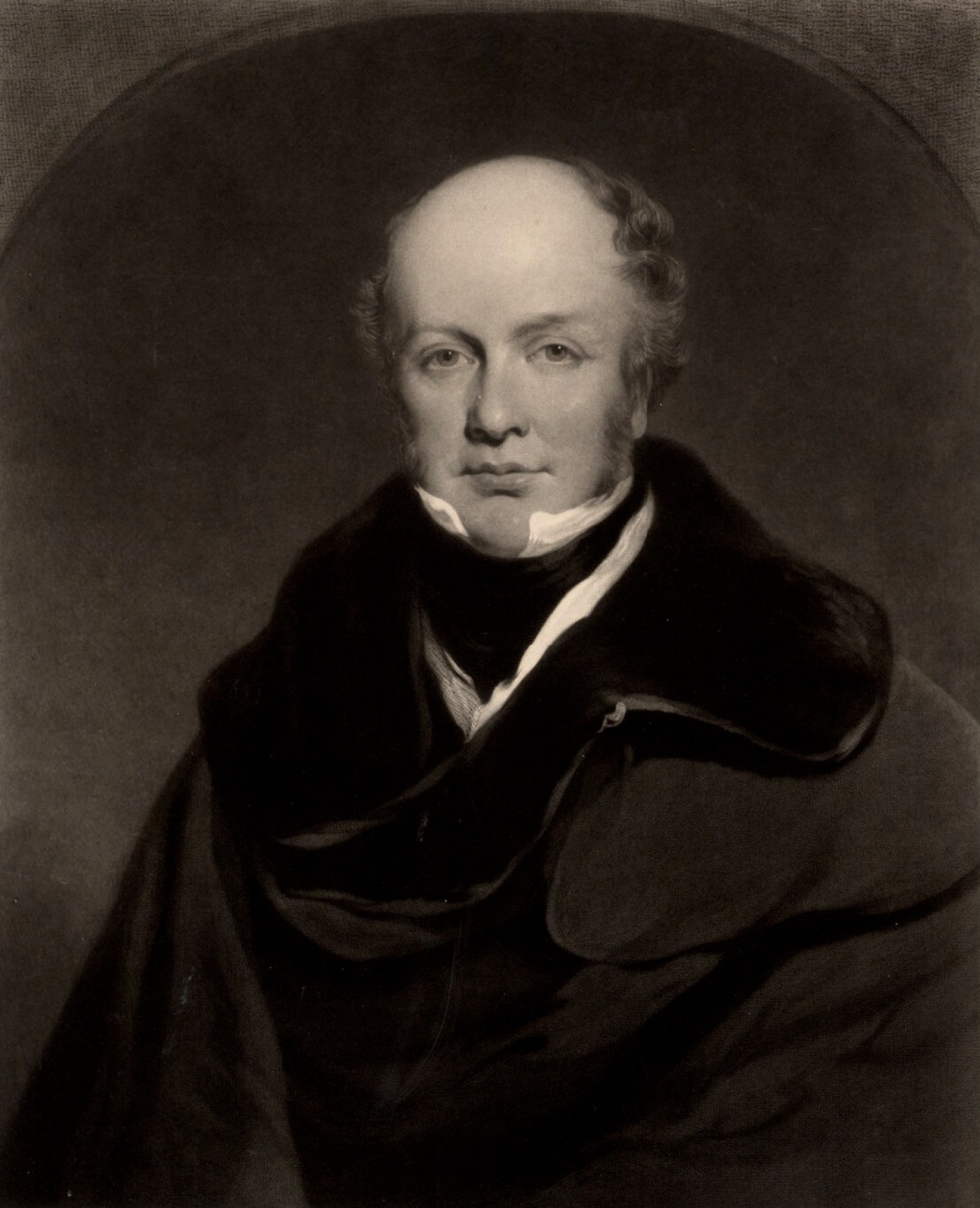
- Engraving by Charles Turner after a Richard Rothwell portrait, 1840

Lord Lieutenant of Tyrone
- In office 1831–1839
- Preceded by: Office created
- Succeeded by: The Earl of Charlemont

Personal details
- Born: 14 December 1777 Ireland
- Died: 8 April 1839 (aged 61)

Military service
- Allegiance: Ireland; United Kingdom
- Branch/service: Irish Militia; British Militia
- Years of service: 1793–1839
- Rank: Colonel
- Commands: Royal Tyrone Militia

Colonel Du Pré Alexander, 2nd Earl of Caledon (14 December 1777 – 8 April 1839), styled The Honourable Du Pré Alexander from 1790 to 1800 and Viscount Alexander from 1800 to 1802, was an Irish politician, militia officer and colonial administrator who was the second child and only son of James Alexander, 1st Earl of Caledon.

== Early life ==
Du Pré Alexander was born on 14 September 1777 in Ireland, the son of James Alexander, 1st Earl of Caledon and his wife Anne. He was educated at Eton College from 1790 to 1796 and subsequently attended Christ Church, Oxford. Alexander returned to Ireland was elected to the Irish House of Commons for Newtownards in 1800 and sat in the until the Parliament of Ireland was abolished in 1801 under the Act of Union 1800. In 1801, he was appointed High Sheriff of Armagh. Alexander succeeded to the title of Earl of Caledon on the death of his father in 1802 and was elected to the House of Lords as an Irish representative peer in 1804.

Alexander was commissioned into the Irish Militia's Royal Tyrone Militia at the rank of ensign on 28 May 1793 when the regiment was raised. He had been promoted to captain by 11 June 1799 when Alexander was again promoted to major by seniority. He was appointed colonel of the regiment on 11 August 1804. While Alexander was away from his unit in the Cape Colony from 1806 to 1810 most of his pay as regimental colonel was devoted to supporting the regiment's band, which entertained the public in Dublin.

== Governorship ==
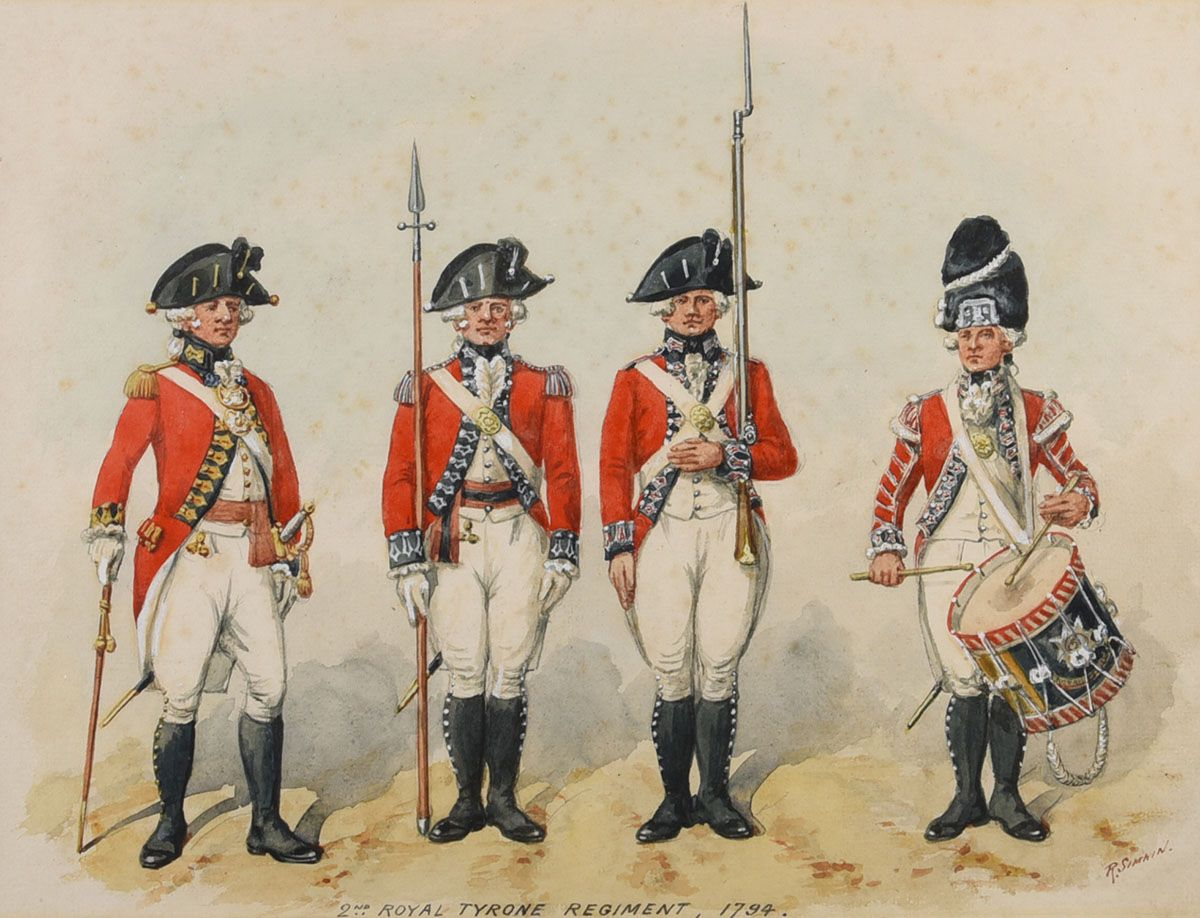
Troops of the Royal Tyrone Militia, which Caledon served in from 1793 to 1839

In July 1806 Calden was appointed governor of the Cape Colony. He was the first civilian governor following the British occupation of the colony that year; the Caledon River and the district Caledon, South Africa there are named after him. Lord Caledon was not, literally, the first British civil governor of the Cape, having been preceded in that capacity by Lord Macartney and Sir George Yonge, successive holders of the office between the first conquest of the Cape, and its cession to the Batavian Republic under the terms of the Peace of Amiens of 1802. Rather, Lord Caledon was the first civilian governor after the Cape's reconquest from the Dutch by General Sir David Baird in 1806. The question of the relationship between the civil and the military authorities of the colony, personified in Lord Caledon's relationship with the Commander-in-Chief, General Sir Henry Grey, was the most troublesome of the former's period of office as governor, and the issue on which he resigned in June 1811.

Less than three years after his departure, in March 1814, an open letter was written defending his record as governor. The writer, Colonel Christopher Bird, Deputy Colonial Secretary at the Cape (subsequently Colonial Secretary), was well qualified to speak, although his partisanship on Lord Caledon's behalf is unconcealed. In another part of the Caledon Papers, Lord Caledon's own appraisal of his governorship of the Cape is to be found. It occurs in the course of a letter which he wrote to the Prime Minister, the 2nd Earl of Liverpool, in 1818 stating his claims to be given a peerage of the United Kingdom: '... The administration of the colonial government during my residence there for a term of four years, was more than usually arduous, in consequence of my being the first civil governor after the capture of the settlement, and from there being no records of a former British government in any of the public offices at The Cape. ... I hope I shall be excused for stating that, upon my own responsibility and under the most embarrassing circumstances, occasioned by the loss of four British frigates which were to have protected the convoy, I detached 2,000 infantry to co-operate with the force from India in the reduction of the Mauritius. In a letter from Lord Minto upon that occasion, he acknowledges the public service I rendered, not only as relating to the fall of the Mauritius, but adds that it was to the co-operation I afforded he was indebted for the means of moving against Java. ...'.

== "Rotten borough" ==
Other political correspondence in the Caledon Papers, in this case during the governorship years, relates to Lord Caledon's relations with the government at home and, in particular, to the parliamentary conduct of the two members, Josias Porcher and Nicholas Vansittart, whom he returned for the notoriously rotten borough of Old Sarum, Wiltshire. He had bought this borough and estate in 1802, for c.£43,000, with a view to increasing his claims to some form of suitable official employment. Though he consistently denied that his appointment to the Cape had been a 'political' one, it was undeniable that the seats for Old Sarum had been an added recommendation. Doubt therefore arose as to whether he owed a political loyalty to the home government for the time being, or to the Grenville administration which had appointed him and which had fallen from power soon afterwards, in March 1807. There is correspondence on this subject with Lord Grenville himself, Porcher and Vansittart; also with Lord Castlereagh, who held office in the government which succeeded Grenville's. The Caledon Cape Papers illuminate this shadowy area between political and public service.

He sold the borough in 1820 to his cousins Josias and James Alexander.

== Marriage and Tyttenhanger ==
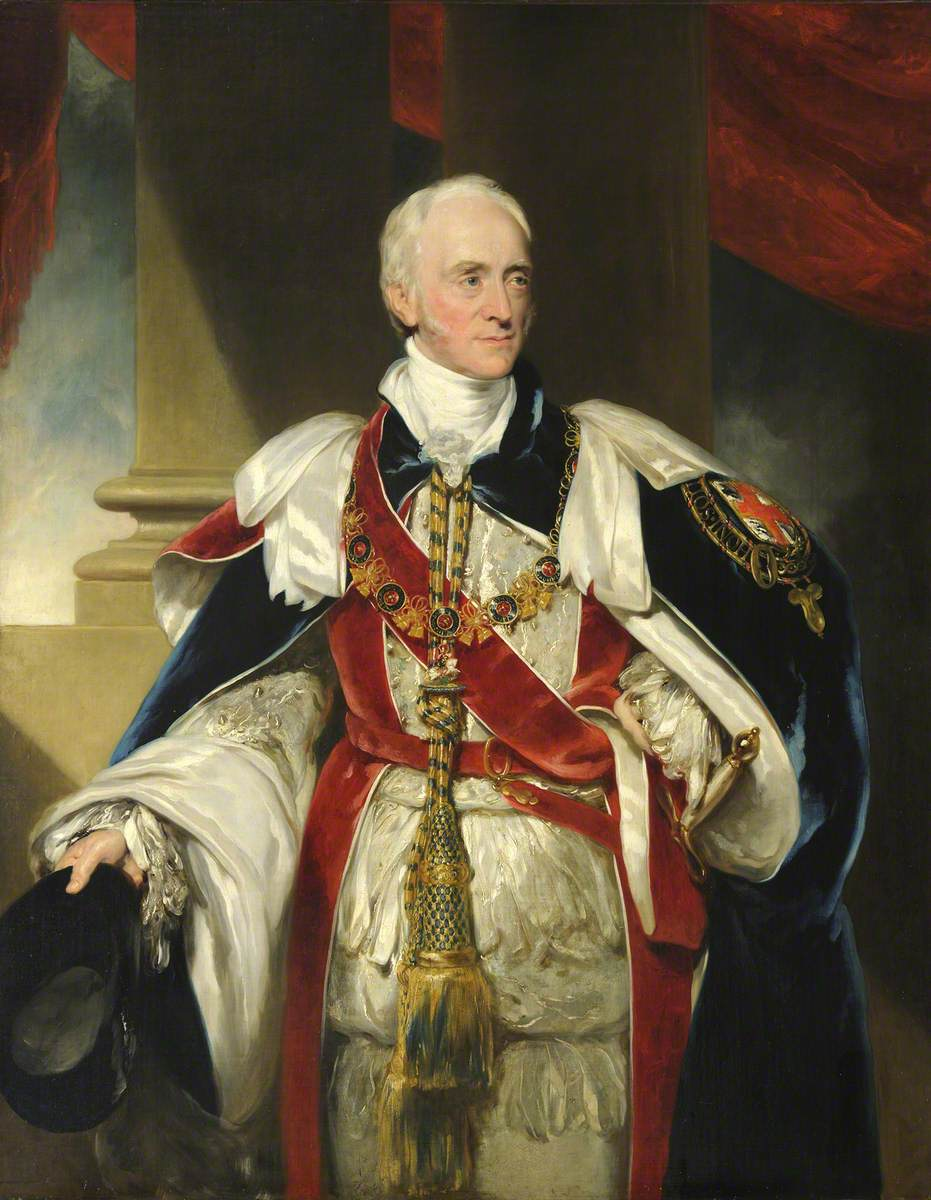
Lord Hardwicke, Caledon's father-in-law

Caledon married Lady Catherine Yorke, daughter of Philip Yorke, 3rd Earl of Hardwicke and Lady Elizabeth Lindsay, on 16 October 1811 in St. James' Church, Westminster, and had issue:

- James Du Pre Alexander, 3rd Earl of Caledon (27 July 1812 – 30 June 1855)

With this marriage the Caledon family effectively inherited Tyttenhanger House near St Albans, Hertfordshire, which had belonged to the 3rd Earl of Hardwicke's grandmother, Katherine Freeman, the sister and heiress of Sir Henry Pope Blount, 3rd and last Baronet. Sir Henry died in 1757 without issue, leaving his sister Katherine, the wife of Rev. William Freeman, his heir. She left an only daughter, Catherine, who married Charles Yorke, second son of Philip Yorke, 1st Earl of Hardwicke, whose son Philip, 3rd Earl of Hardwicke, on his death in 1834, left four daughters, to the second of whom, Catherine, the wife of the 2nd Earl of Caledon, came the manor of Tyttenhanger.

The Royal Tyrone Militia was disembodied in 1816 at the conclusion of the Napoleonic Wars and Lord Caledon arranged for a large mansion and two other houses in Caledon to be used as the headquarters and barracks for the permanent staff of the regiment. He also provided work for the men as weavers or as labourers on his estate. When the permanent staff was reduced in 1822 he selected for discharge the senior sergeants who could claim a pension, and arranged for the younger corporals and drummers to join the new police force in the province of Munster. He encouraged the remaining staff to put money into a savings bank to support their families in the event of further reductions. He remained colonel of the regiment until the end of his life, when he was succeeded by his eldest son.

Lord Caledon was invested as a Knight of St Patrick on 20 August 1821 and was appointed Lord Lieutenant of County Tyrone in 1831. He died on 8 April 1839 at Caledon, aged 61, much mourned by his tenants in the model town of Caledon, which he had rebuilt and enlarged so sympathetically. A loyal address from the tenantry issued a few years earlier alludes to his 'acts of liberality, munificence and kindness' and there is plenty of evidence to confirm that this was no mere empty elegy. 'Lord Caledon', wrote Inglis in his book Ireland (1834), 'is all that could be desire – a really good resident country gentleman'.

Lady Caledon died on 8 July 1863, having bequeathed Tyttenhanger to her daughter-in-law Jane, with an entail upon her four children and, according to one source, the estate descended to her eldest son James Alexander, 4th Earl of Caledon, who died in 1898. His widow became lady of the manor and held it in trust for her children. Other sources indicate that Tyttenhanger was the home of Lady Jane Van Koughnet, the daughter of the 4th Earl of Caledon, and her husband, Commander E. B. Van Koughnet, until her death in 1941. The house was sold in 1973.

Parliament of Ireland
Preceded by Sir John Blaquiere, 1st Bt; Robert Alexander	Member of Parliament for Newtownards; 1800–1801; With: Sir John Blaquiere, 1st Bt	Succeeded by Parliament of the United Kingdom
Political offices
Preceded by The Earl of Desart	Representative peer for Ireland; 1804–1839	Succeeded by The Lord Farnham
Government offices
Preceded by Henry George Grey, acting	Governor of the Cape Colony; 1807–1811	Succeeded by Henry George Grey, acting
Honorary titles
New office	Lord Lieutenant of Tyrone; 1831–1839	Succeeded by The Earl of Charlemont
Peerage of Ireland
Preceded by James Alexander	Earl of Caledon; 1802–1839	Succeeded by James Du Pre Alexander
