= Royal Tyrone Fusiliers =

Irish and British infantry regiment (1793–1953)

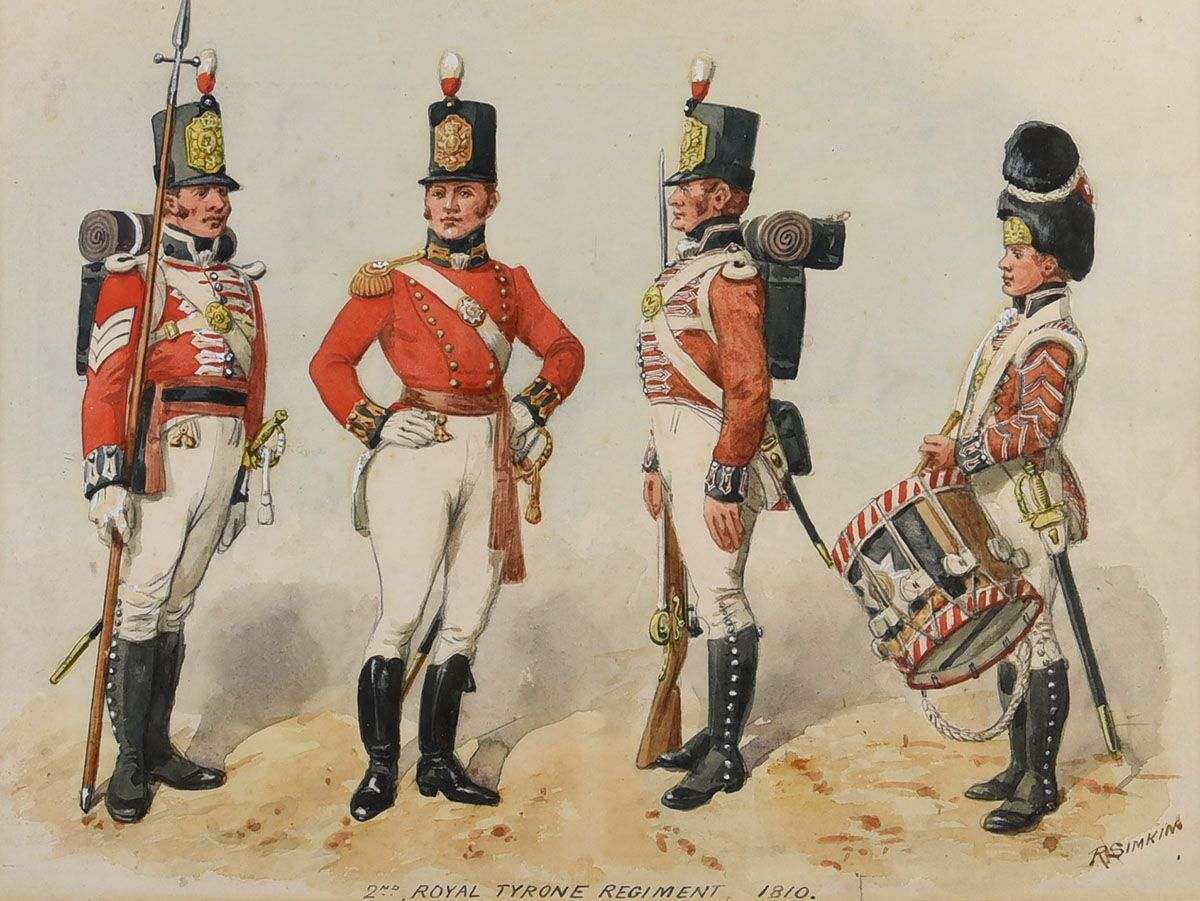
- Regimental sergeant, lieutenant, private and drummer in 1810
- Active: 1793–1953
- Allegiance: Kingdom of Ireland (1793–1800); United Kingdom (1801–1953)
- Branch: Irish Militia; British Militia; British Army
- Type: Infantry
- Role: Line infantry
- Size: 1 battalion
- Part of: Royal Inniskilling Fusiliers
- Garrison/HQ: St Lucia Barracks, Omagh
- Engagements: Irish Rebellion of 1798

Commanders
- Notable commanders: John Hamilton, 1st Marquess of Abercorn; Du Pré Alexander, 2nd Earl of Caledon

The Royal Tyrone Militia was a line infantry regiment of the Irish Militia raised in 1793 for domestic security during the French Revolutionary Wars, seeing action during the Irish Rebellion of 1798. In 1801 the regiment became part of the British Militia under the Acts of Union 1801 and was renamed the Royal Tyrone Fusiliers in 1833. The regiment was later embodied during all of Britain's major wars and in 1881 became a battalion of the British Army's Royal Inniskilling Fusiliers. During World War I, as part of the Special Reserve the battalion trained thousands of reinforcements for battalions of the Royal Inniskilling Fusiliers serving overseas. The battalion subsequently did little of note before being formally disbanded in 1953.

== Background ==
Although there are scattered references to town guards in 1584, no organised militia existed in Ireland before 1660. After that, some militia forces were organised in the reign of King Charles II and in the war between James II and William III, but it was not until 1715 that the Irish Militia came under statutory authority. During the 18th Century there were various Volunteer Associations and local militia units controlled by the landowners, concerned mainly with internal security. In 1778, during the War of American Independence, the threat of invasion by the Americans' allies, France and Spain, appeared to be serious. While most of the Regular Army was fighting overseas, the coasts of England and Wales were defended by the embodied Militia, but Ireland had no equivalent force. Under the leadership of George Ogle, the Parliament of Ireland passed a Militia Act. This failed to create an effective militia force but opened the way for the Irish Volunteers to fill the gap; even Ogle became a general in the Volunteers. The paramilitary Volunteers, however, were outside the control of either the parliament or the Dublin Castle administration. The invasion threat having receded, the Volunteers diminished in numbers but remained a political force. On the outbreak of the French Revolutionary War In 1793, the Irish administration passed an effective Militia Act that created an official Irish Militia, while the paramilitary volunteers were essentially banned. The new Act was based on existing English precedents, with the men conscripted by ballot to fill county quotas (paid substitutes were permitted) and the officers having to meet certain property qualifications.

== Royal Tyrone Militia ==
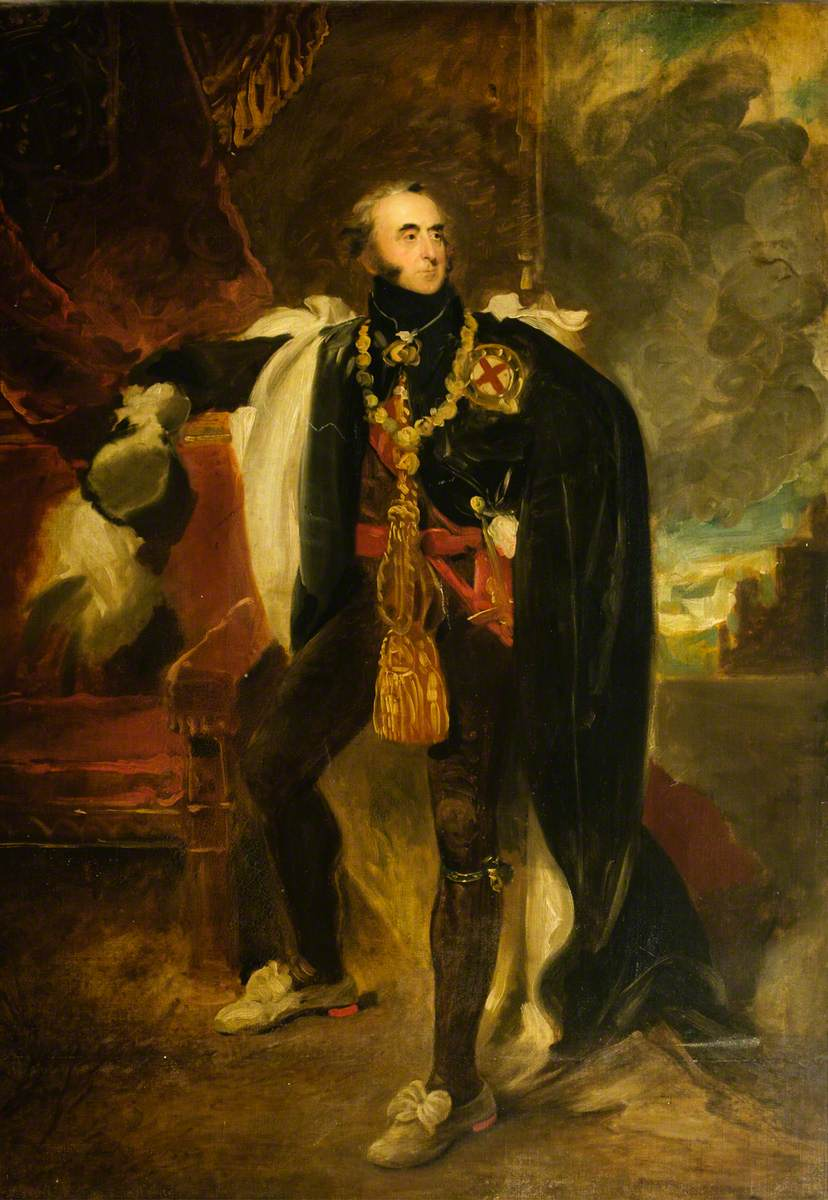
Lord Abercorn, the regiment's first lieutenant colonel

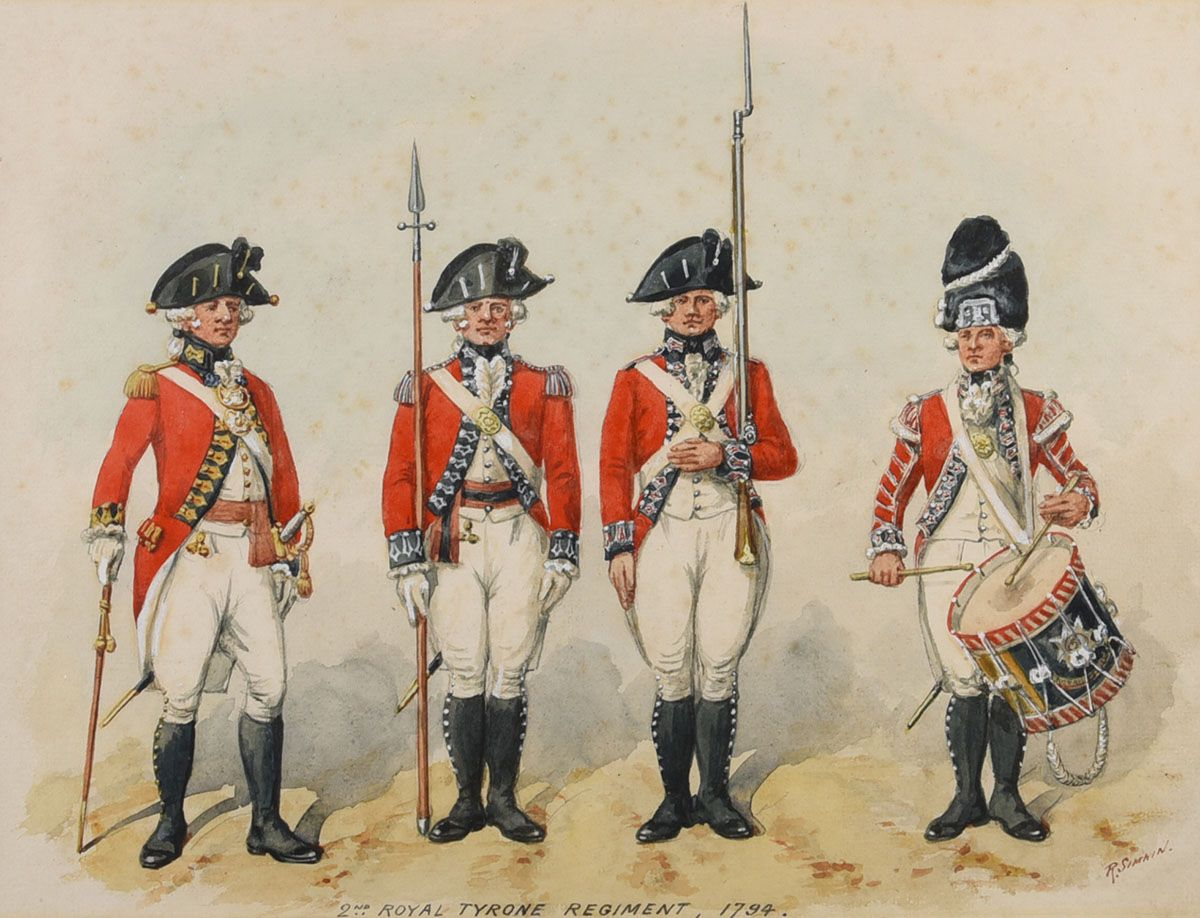
Regimental lieutenant, sergeant, private and drummer in 1794

Under the new Act County Tyrone was given a quota of 560 men to raise in 10 companies, and on 3 May the regiment was ordered to be formed. John Hamilton, 1st Marquess of Abercorn, a prominent figure in Co Tyrone politics and a friend of British Prime Minister William Pitt the Younger, was commissioned as Lieutenant-Colonel Commandant, and he appointed his officers during May, with Lt-Col the Hon Thomas Knox, MP, as his second-in-command. (Abercorn also commissioned his six-year-old son, Viscount Hamilton, as an Ensign.) The warrant to call out the regiment for fulltime duty was issued from Dublin Castle on 18 July and the regiment was duly embodied on 23 August 1793 at the county town of Caledon. At the same time, it was granted the title Royal Tyrone Militia. Balloting for the Tyrone regiment seems to have passed without incident, though there were serious anti-militia protests in a number of other Irish counties.

=== Training and service ===
There was some difficulty in providing arms for the new regiments (many were bought second-hand), and in September a corporal's guard of the Royal Tyrones had to hand their seven muskets over to their reliefs when they went off duty. Equipment such as knapsacks arrived in December. From January 1794 a detachment under Lieutenant Andrew Bell was trained to man the light cannon issued as 'battalion guns'. During this training period, the regiment was quartered at Strabane, Co Tyrone, and in March the men were commended by Lt-Col Knox and their officers and by the town officials for their discipline and good conduct when they were called out to deal with the 'criminal and highly improper behaviour' of the militia of a neighbouring county. However, official policy was to station militia regiments away from their recruiting area. On 15 March the new muskets were issued to the men and on 17 March the Royal Tyrone Militia marched out to its appointed station at Waterford, which it reached in April. Three companies were then detached to the barracks at New Geneva on 23 May. When the regiment had a field day at New Geneva in June, the gun detachment was reported to be 'admirably trained'.

Lieutenant-Col Knox resigned his commission soon afterwards and the Marquess of Abercorn appointed Nathaniel Montgomery-Moore in his place on 1 June. Moore took over the command at Waterford, and at the end of August the regiment moved to the various barracks at Galway, with detachments at Tuam and Oughterard Barracks. The regiment, including its battalion guns and a detachment of the Royal Artillery, were ordered to be on high alert in case of a French invasion. Early in 1795 the Irish government ordered an augmentation of the militia from 1 April; the establishment of the Royal Tyrone Militia was increased to 42 sergeants, 22 drummers, and 700 rank and file. The additional men were to be found by voluntary enlistment where possible, and in March the regiment sent recruiting parties back to various towns in Co Tyrone: Dungannon, Strabane and Newtownstewart, and later to Augher, Clogher and Aughnacloy. While many Irish militia regiments were concentrated in training camps in the summer of 1795, the Royal Tyrone was dispersed across Counties Leitrim, Mayo and Roscommon, two companies each to Carrick-on-Shannon and Boyle on 28 April, the other six companies to various stations from 12 June with the regimental headquarters at Westport. However, the regiment had marched to Dublin by November 1795, quartered in various barracks around the city and with detachments at Dunboyne, Rathcoole and Swords that were rotated monthly. The regiment underwent field days and inspections in the summer of 1796 and on 1–2 November it marched to winter quarters at Kells (HQ), Cootehill, Oldcastle, and Trim.

=== Bantry Bay ===
Anxiety about a possible French invasion grew during the autumn of 1796 and preparations were made for field operations. A large French expeditionary force appeared in Bantry Bay on 21 December and troops from all over Ireland were marched towards the threatened area. The Royal Tyrone received orders on 26 December to march to Cork forthwith. However, the French fleet was scattered by winter storms, several ships being wrecked, and none of the French troops succeeded in landing; there was no sign of a rising by the United Irishmen. The invasion was called off on 29 December. The Royal Tyrone Militia was halted on its route to Cork, half the regiment at Nenagh and half at Roscrea, where they spent a few days. Then on 2 February 1797 the regiment was diverted to Limerick where it was to be stationed, except the flank (Grenadier and Light) companies, which were proposed to be detached to join composite battalions drawn from several militia regiments. The Light Companies of the Royal Tyrone and Louth Militia left for Kilkenny on 27 February to join the 1st Light Battalion, the Grenadiers remained with the regiment.

On 19 February 1797 a further augmentation of the Royal Tyrone Militia was announced, bringing its strength up to 1000. Recruiting parties left for Co Tyrone to raise the additional men, who were to be enlisted for the duration of the war and for two months afterwards and were paid a bounty. When the militiamen of 1793 reached the end of their four-year enlistment in 1797, most of the Irish regiments were able to maintain their numbers through re-enlistments (for a bounty). The Marquis of Abercorn encouraged Esprit de corps in the Royal Tyrone Militia by instituting a badge of merit for the best soldiers with over three years' service. In March 1798 the men of the regiment donated 7 days' pay (14 days for officers) to the war effort.

=== Irish Rebellion of 1798 ===
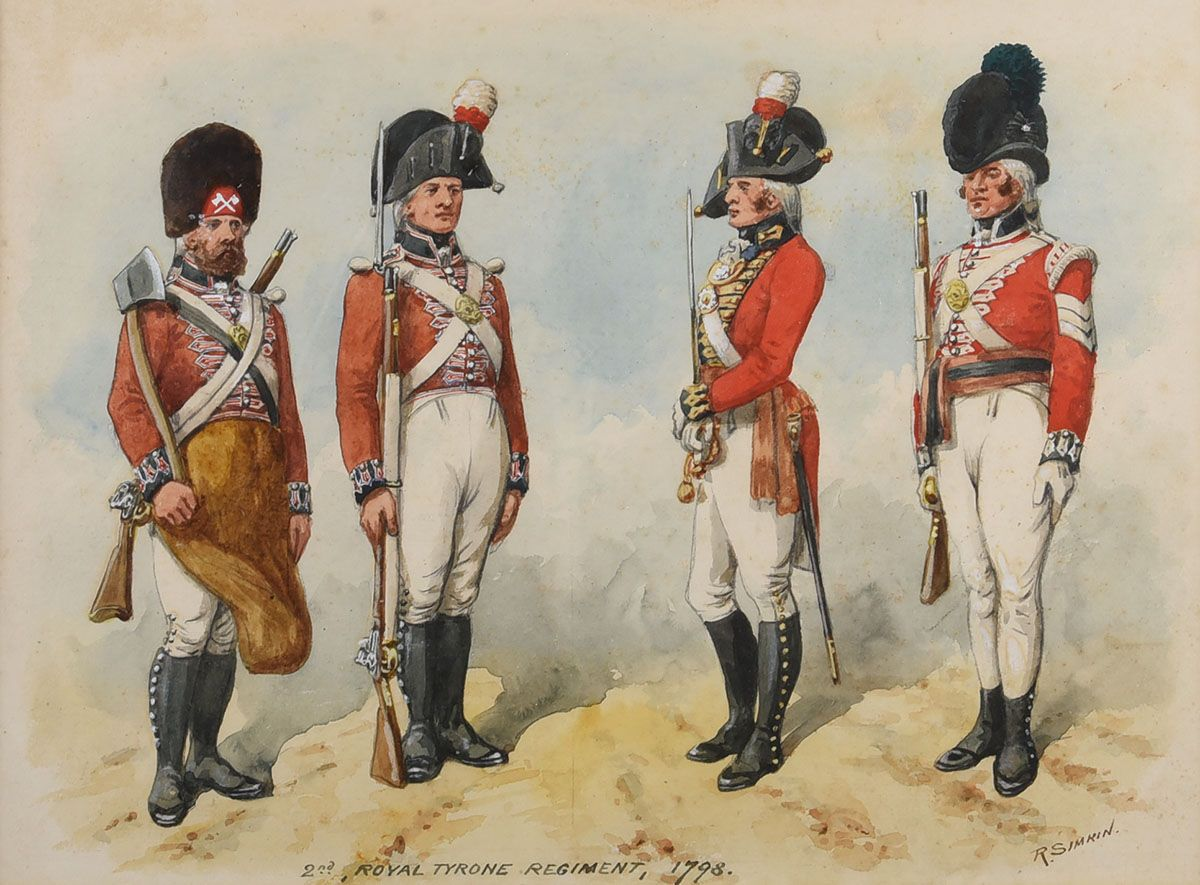
Regimental sapper, private, lieutenant and sergeant in 1798

Between June and September 1797 the regiment was distributed from Limerick to towns across County Kerry: Castleisland, Dingle, Killarney and Tralee, with HQ at Tarbert. It was still at these stations in January 1798 when a sentry of the regiment at the Custom House in Tralee was murdered by a man disguised in woman's clothes. Tensions were building in Ireland, and the authorities endeavoured to seize illegal arms caches and billet troops in disaffected areas; in April the regiment was ordered to send out three detachments accompanied by Yeomanry Cavalry. On 18 May the regiment marched to Cork where there was a large concentration of troops.

The Light Company of the Royal Tyrone Militia was still detached in County Kildare when the Irish Rebellion broke out. One detachment had been at Ballymore Eustace since 10 May in company with elements of the 9th Light Dragoons, the Antrim and the Armagh Militia. Early on 24 May armed men broke into the room of the detachment commander, but were beaten off. Several houses in which soldiers were quartered were set on fire and in the attack seven dragoons and four militiamen and Lt McFarland of the Royal Tyrones were killed in the Battle of Ballymore-Eustace. The dragoons later drove off the attackers. Meanwhile, Lt Eadie and a party of 23 of the Royal Tyrones who had been stationed for some months at Ballitore had been ordered to join the rest of the company at Calverstown. Having stopped for breakfast at Narraghmore, the party was too late to save a number of loyalists being killed by rebels. However, he placed his men behind a wall and ambushed the rebels with a volley. They retired to Ballitore, where they gained reinforcements and pursued Eadie's party towards Calverstown. By the time a large force of militia and fencibles was assembled Ballintore had been abandoned, but the Tyrone militiamen were able to identify one rebel leader, who was killed by the Suffolk Fencibles. The Light Company of the Royal Tyrone Militia subsequently saw action with 1st Light Battalion at the Battles of Tubberneering (4 June), Arklow (9 June) and Vinegar Hill (21 June).

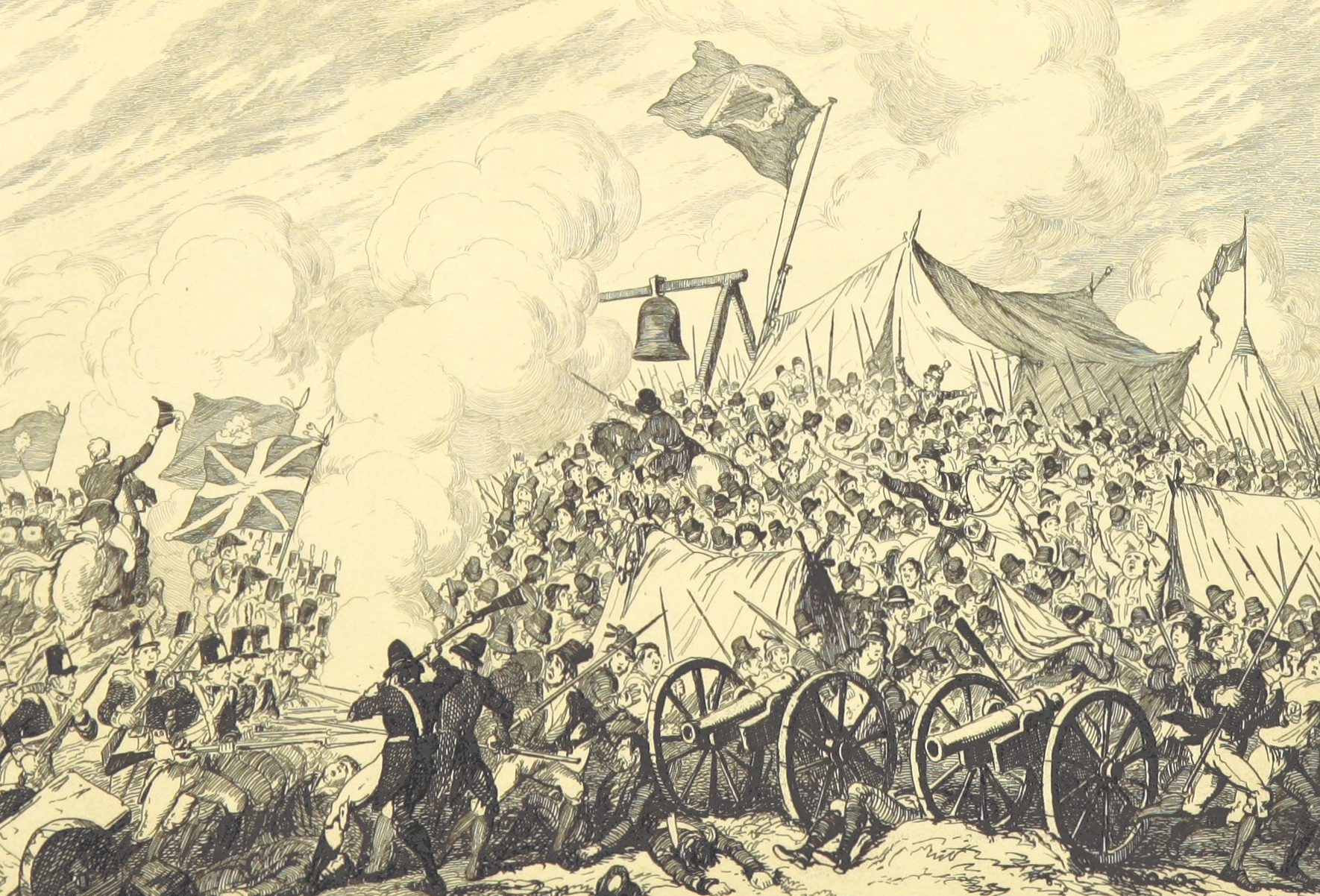
The Battle of Vinegar Hill, which the regiment fought in

The Battle of Vinegar Hill broke the back of the rebellion, and the last rebels were defeated in mid-July. A French invasion in August led to a further outbreak and it was not suppressed until the Franco-Irish forces were defeated. The Royal Tyrone Miliitia in Cork were distant from the fighting and not engaged. The Marquess of Abercorn resigned his commission in November 1798 and was replaced as colonel-commandant by Viscount Corry, who succeeded as 2nd Earl Belmore in 1802. Lieutenant-Col Montgomery-Moore also resigned, on 30 April 1799, and Major the Hon A.C. Hamilton and Captain the Hon Du Pré Alexander were promoted into the consequent vacancies. By 1801 Maj Alexander (by then Viscount Alexander) was a second lt-col in the regiment.

The regiment remained in barracks at Cork throughout 1799, though in May and August it was ordered to be ready, with full ammunition pouches, to march at short notice if another French invasion appeared. In case of an alarm in the garrison, the Royal Tyrone Militia's alarm post was at the lower end of Patrick Street. The Light Company continued to be detached, at Ballinasloe, then at Athlone as part of a Light Infantry brigade, but was kept up to strength by suitable volunteers from the rest of the regiment at Cork. At the beginning of 1800 there was a call for volunteers from the militia to join the Regular Army, and 227 men from the nine companies at Cork did so in January, almost all to the 1st Battalion, Royal Scots, at Newry. Volunteering continued from February to April, with another 182 men from the Royal Tyrones coming forward, of whom 132 joined the 1st Royal Scots, with eight junior officers gaining commissions in that regiment.

In February 1800 the regiment was ordered to County Meath, being stationed at Trim and Kells, and later scattered more widely over the county, only assembling for inspection in September. In October it marched to Dublin, where it was quartered in various barracks around the city. There were numerous guards and outposts to find, and the Dublin brigade was frequently paraded in marching order as practice for urgent call-outs, as well as ceremonial parades. By early 1802 a peace treaty was being negotiated and the regiment was marched back to Co Tyrone, to be quartered at Omagh, the Light Company joining from Athlone and being quartered at Newtownstewart. The warrant for disembodying the regiment was issued on 5 May, and the men were paid off on 13 May, leaving the permanent staff of non-commissioned officers (NCOs) and drummers under the adjutant.

=== Napoleonic Wars ===
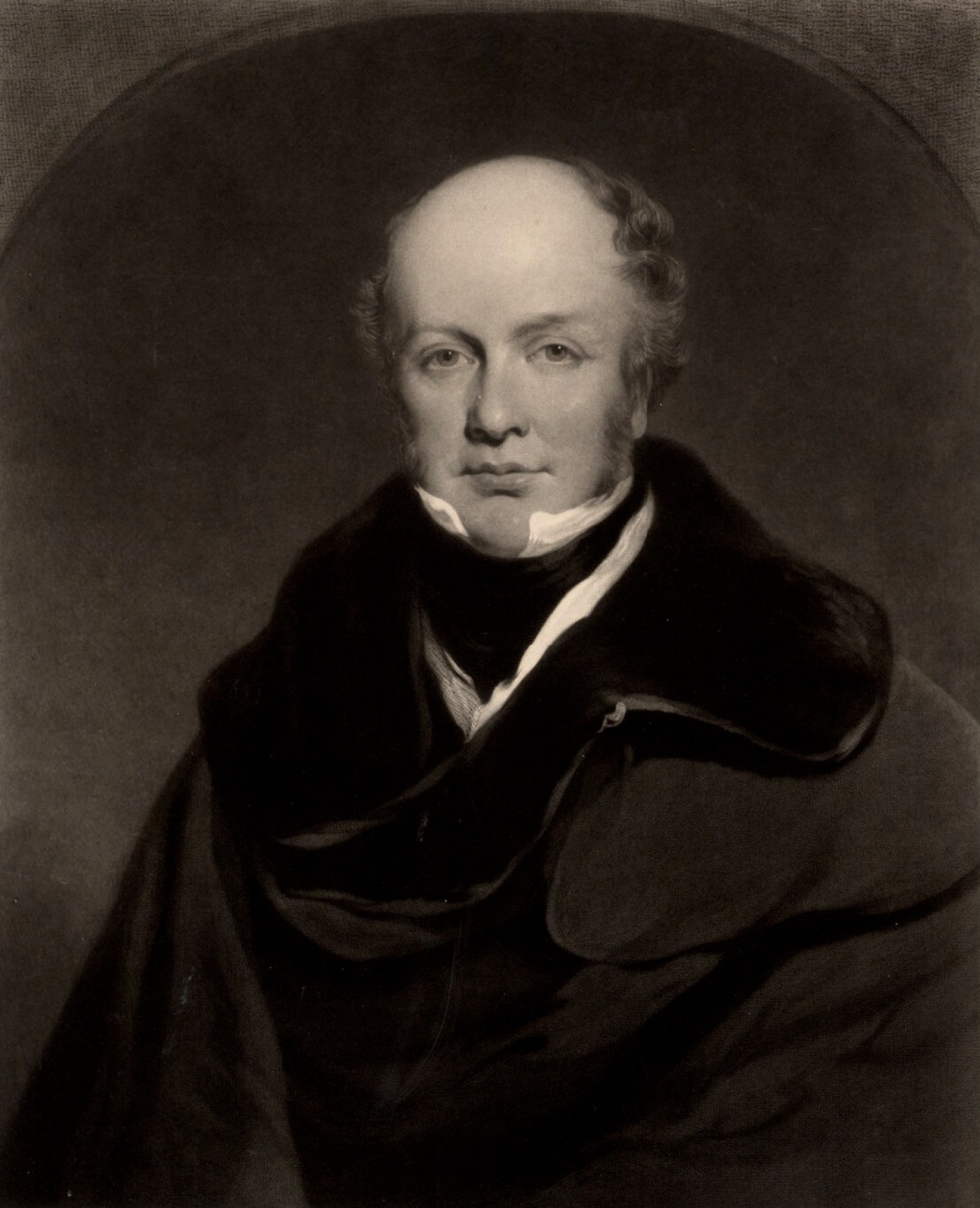
Lord Caledon, the regimental colonel from 1804 to 1839

As the Peace of Amiens was short-lived, the regiment was re-embodied just a year later. One company was called out on 25 March, and six more companies were embodied by the end of April, the men being obtained by re-enlistments and voluntary enlistment. The remainder of the regiment was recruited in May, bringing its strength to 690 rank and file, out of an establishment of 700. A field outside Omagh was hired as a drill ground. In early August a party went to Dublin to draw camp equipment, and during the month the regiment marched by 'divisions' of three or four companies to Limerick, which was believed to be in danger from a sudden French attack on the River Shannon. The Light Company was once again detached to form part of a composite light battalion. Du Pré Alexander, 2nd Earl of Caledon, first commissioned into the regiment as an ensign on 28 May 1793, was appointed colonel on 11 August 1804.

Over the following years the regiment carried out garrison duties at various towns across Ireland. It moved from Limerick to Dublin in July 1804, then in September to Tipperary and other stations across the county. At the end of July 1806 it moved to Clonmel and then in October to County Wexford, with HQ in Wexford. The regiment had been ordered to expand by a further 300 men in 1805 (Sir James Stronge, 3rd Baronet, was appointed as a second lieutenant-colonel in the augmented regiment on 18 February 1806), but the Regulars continued to take volunteers from it each of the years 1805–7 over 100 men took the bounty to transfer to the Regular Army, but only a small number volunteered in 1808. In January 1808 the regiment went to Dundalk, where over 300 recruits arrived, known in the regiment as the 'Wet Day Boys' after their winter march to join. It left Dundalk in March and by April was headquartered once more in Limerick with the companies (including the Light Company, now that the Light Battalions had been broken up) at various surrounding stations until June 1809 when it returned to Dublin. The Regular continued to take the volunteers: around 30 in 1809, and over 130 in 1810. Among the remaining men serving since the embodiment there was a strong desire for discharge: some of the Tyrone militiamen paid for legal advice on their claim for discharge after five years' service, which advice supported their claim. Despite having recruiting parties active across Co Tyrone the regiment was continually understrength. This was a general problem among the Irish Militia, and a new round of balloting was authorised: 11 out of 27 parishes in Co Tyrone held ballots, but those enlisted were generally volunteer substitutes paid a bounty from parish funds or by insurance schemes. Under the 1812 Militia Act the regiment was permitted to maintain its strength by enlisting boy soldiers aged 14 or more, many of whom were children of soldiers serving in the regiment.

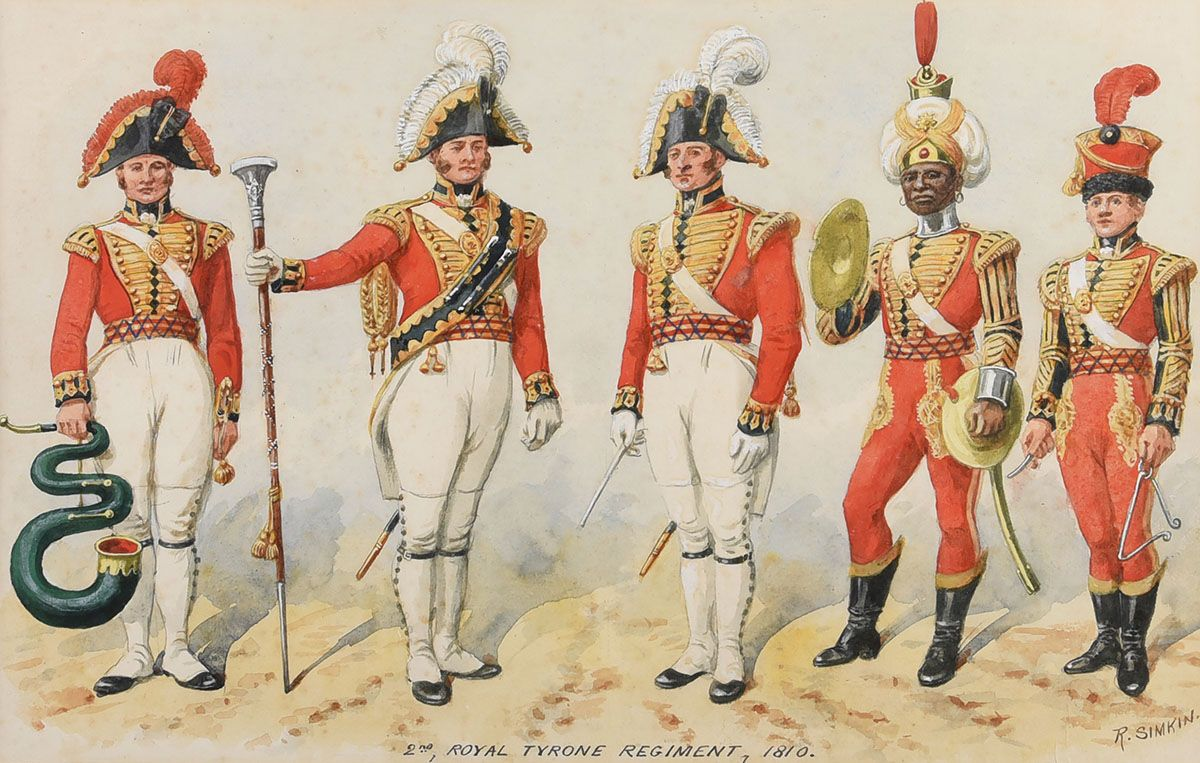
Regimental musicians in 1810

The Earl of Caledon served as governor of Cape Colony from 1806 to 1810 (Lt-Col William Stewart, appointed on 16 April 1805, commanded in his absence), and while he was away most of his pay as colonel of the regiment was devoted to supporting the regimental band. The band, including seven or eight black musicians, wore distinctive uniforms made by London tailors, and their musicianship made their performances popular among the public, especially in Dublin.

The regiment left Dublin in April 1811 and went to Galway, with the usual detachments in surrounding towns, HQ later moving to Tuam. In July 1811 Irish Militia regiments were invited to volunteer for up to two years service anywhere in the United Kingdom, exchanging with English and Scottish units. Almost the whole of the Royal Tyrone Fusiliers accepted this, the remainder soon agreeing rather than be called 'Black belts' (the derogatory term applied to those regiments that refused to volunteer). In April 1813 the regiment was moved from Tuam to Limerick, then to Cork in May, ready to embark for England. However, the embarkation was cancelled, and the regiment did not see service outside Ireland until 1855. In February 1814 the regiment was sent to Clonmel, with detachments scattered widely over Co Tipperary, HQ moving to Cashel in July and then to Tullamore in September.

Napoleon abdicated in April 1814 and with the end of the war a number of Irish Militia regiments were marched back to their home counties and disembodied. The Royal Tyrone Militia, however, was one of nine Irish Militia regiments that remained embodied while the War of 1812 and the Congress of Vienna continued. It stayed at Tullamore until February 1815 when it was ordered to march to Derry. Here the men who had served over five years were progressively discharged, though recruiting parties with the band continued to tour the towns of Co Tyrone to obtain replacements to keep it at its lower (pre-augmentation) establishment strength. Detachments of the regiment stationed across County Donegal were employed in assisting the Revenue Service in seizing contraband. The militia was kept embodied during the brief Waterloo campaign and its aftermath. In October 1815 the regiment was sent to Birr, County Offaly, and its out-stations, where it stayed until the order to disembody arrived on 11 March 1816. The Royal Tyrone Militia marched back to Aughnacloy where it was disembodied on 29 March.

=== Long peace ===
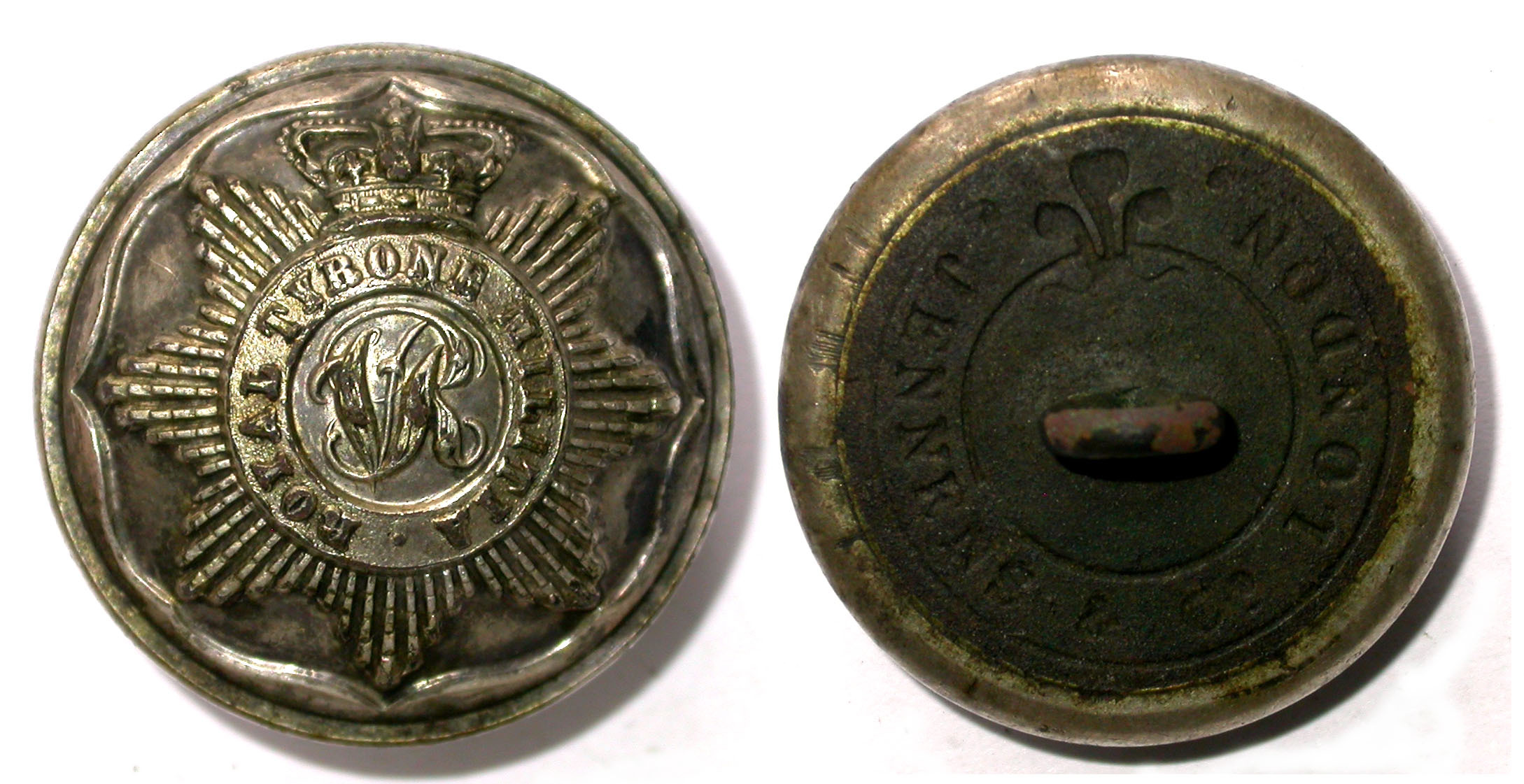
Regimental button made between 1837 and 1855

After Waterloo there was a long peace. Although officers continued to be commissioned into the militia and ballots might still held, the regiments were rarely assembled for training. The Earl of Caledon provided a large mansion and other buildings at Caledon as HQ and barracks for the permanent staff. The permanent staffs of militia regiments were progressively reduced. For the first reduction, in 1822, the Earl of Caledon selected the senior sergeants who were eligible for a pension, and arranged for the younger corporals and drummers to join the new police force in the Province of Munster. Further reductions were ordered in 1829 and 1835.

The Earl of Caledon died on 8 April 1839 and on 1 May his son, James Alexander, 3rd Earl of Caledon, a former Regular officer, was appointed Colonel in his place. A large number of officers were appointed and promoted in the regiment on 1 May 1846, though by now the permanent staff had been reduced to the adjutant, sergeant-major and no more than eight sergeants.

== Royal Tyrone Fusiliers ==
=== 1852 Reforms ===
The Militia of the United Kingdom was revived by the Militia Act 1852, enacted during a renewed period of international tension. As before, units were raised and administered on a county basis, and filled by voluntary enlistment (although conscription by means of the Militia Ballot might be used if the counties failed to meet their quotas). Training was for 56 days on enlistment, then for 21–28 days per year, during which the men received full army pay. Under the Act, Militia units could be embodied by Royal Proclamation for full-time home defence service in three circumstances:

1. 'Whenever a state of war exists between Her Majesty and any foreign power'.
2. 'In all cases of invasion or upon imminent danger thereof'.
3. 'In all cases of rebellion or insurrection'.

The Royal Tyrone Militia was revived, moving its HQ from Caledon to Omagh, and James Stronge, formerly of the 5th Dragoon Guards, was appointed Lt-Col Commandant on 20 October 1854. The post of colonel in the militia disappeared after the 1852 Act, and the last colonel of the Royal Tyrone Militia, the 3rd Earl of Caledon, died on 30 June 1855.

=== Tyrone Artillery Militia ===
The 1852 Act introduced Militia Artillery units in addition to the traditional infantry regiments. Their role was to man coastal defences and fortifications, relieving the Royal Artillery (RA) for active service. The Tyrone Artillery Militia was raised on 1 April 1855 at Charlemont, later moving to Dungannon. Several officers transferred from the Royal Tyrone Fusiliers to assist in its formation. It appears to have used the name 'Royal Tyrone Artillery' (following theFusiliers) but this title appears to have been unofficial and does not appear in the Army List. The unit was merged into the Mid-Ulster Artillery Militia at Dungannon in 1875.

=== Crimean War & Indian Mutiny ===
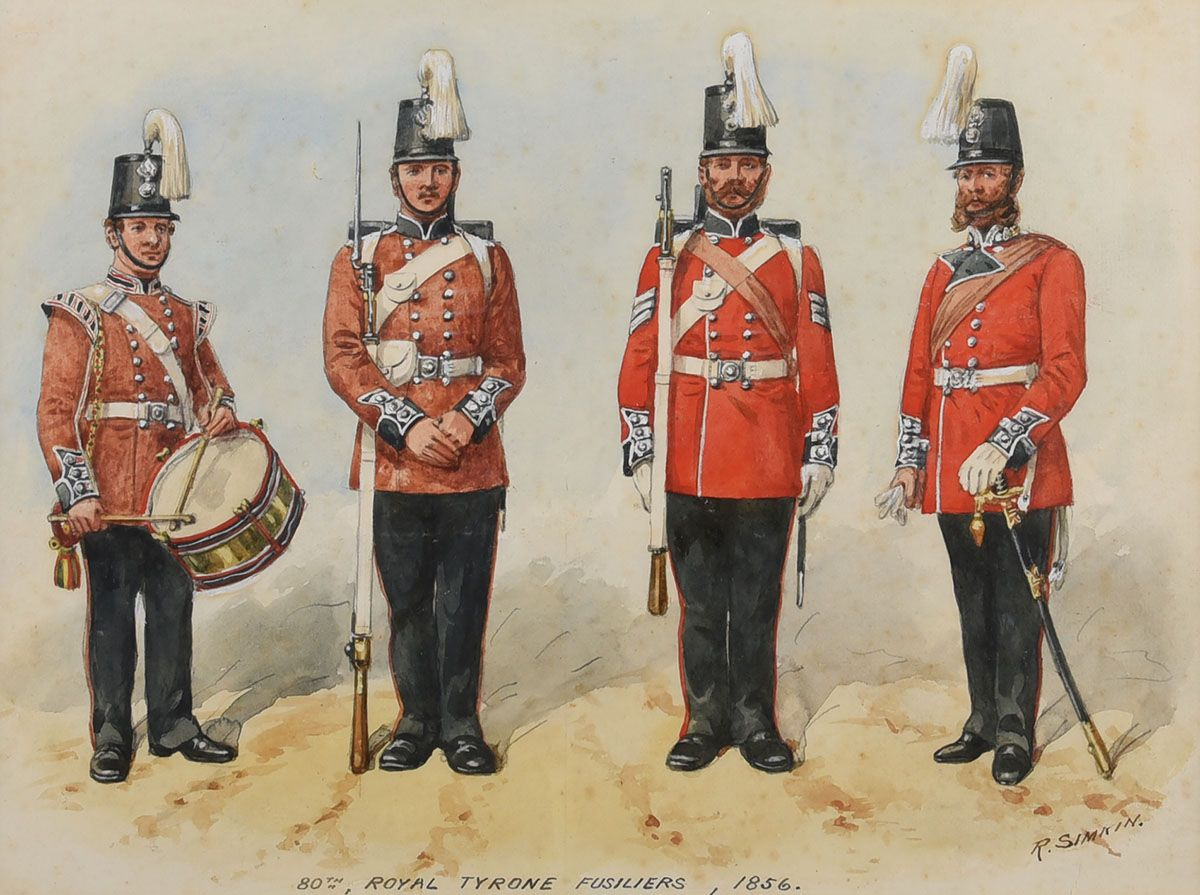
Regimental drummer, private, sergeant and officer in 1856

War having broken out with Russia and an expeditionary force sent to the Crimea in 1854, the militia was called out to take over garrison and defence duties at home. The Royal Tyrone Militia was embodied at Caledon Barracks in January 1855 and sent out recruiting parties. The recruits were assembled at Omagh and by June it had almost reached its establishment strength of 600 men. The regiment was redesignated as the Royal Tyrone Fusiliers on 18 April 1855.

On 13 and 14 June the regiment went by train to Londonderry and embarked for Liverpool, from where it was sent by rail to Sheffield. In August 78 men volunteered for the Regular Army and one ensign received a Regular commission. On 20 December the regiment moved to Sunderland with four companies detached to garrison Tynemouth. Another group of 86 men and one officer were supplied to the Regulars in February 1856. The Crimean War ended on 30 March 1856, and on 24 May the regiment left Sunderland by rail to Whitehaven. It embarked aboard the SS Tynwald and landed at Dublin before proceeding back to Omagh. There the Royal Tyrone Fusiliers were disembodied on 29 August.

The permanent staff were stationed at Dungannon, where the uniforms and equipment were put into store. However, the regiment was embodied again on 3 November 1857 after large reinforcements of regular troops had been sent to help suppress the Indian Mutiny. It was first stationed at Armagh, then on 15 December it went to Belfast where it embarked on the steamer Elk, with the baggage on another steamer, for Glasgow. It then went by rail to Hamilton, South Lanarkshire, with two companies detached to Paisley, Renfrewshire. In April 1858 the regiment provided 49 volunteers to the Regulars, but on 22 April the government ordered the militia to be disembodied. The men returned on 6 May by rail to Glasgow and the steamer Rose to Londonderry, arriving at Omagh on 9 May to be discharged.

The militia thereafter carried out their annual training obligations. During the Fenian Rising of 1867 the permanent staff of the Royal Tyrone Fusiliers mounted guard on the regimental armoury and recruitment and annual training were suspended until 1871. When training was resumed the Royal Tyrone Fusiliers were brigaded with the Fermanagh Light Infantry from Enniskillen for exercises.

The Militia Reserve introduced in 1867 consisted of present and former militiamen across the UK who undertook to serve overseas in case of war. From 1871 The militia came under the War Office rather than their counties and by now the battalions had a large cadre of permanent staff (about 30). Around a third of the recruits and many young officers went on to join the regular army.

== Royal Inniskilling Fusiliers ==
=== Cardwell Reforms ===
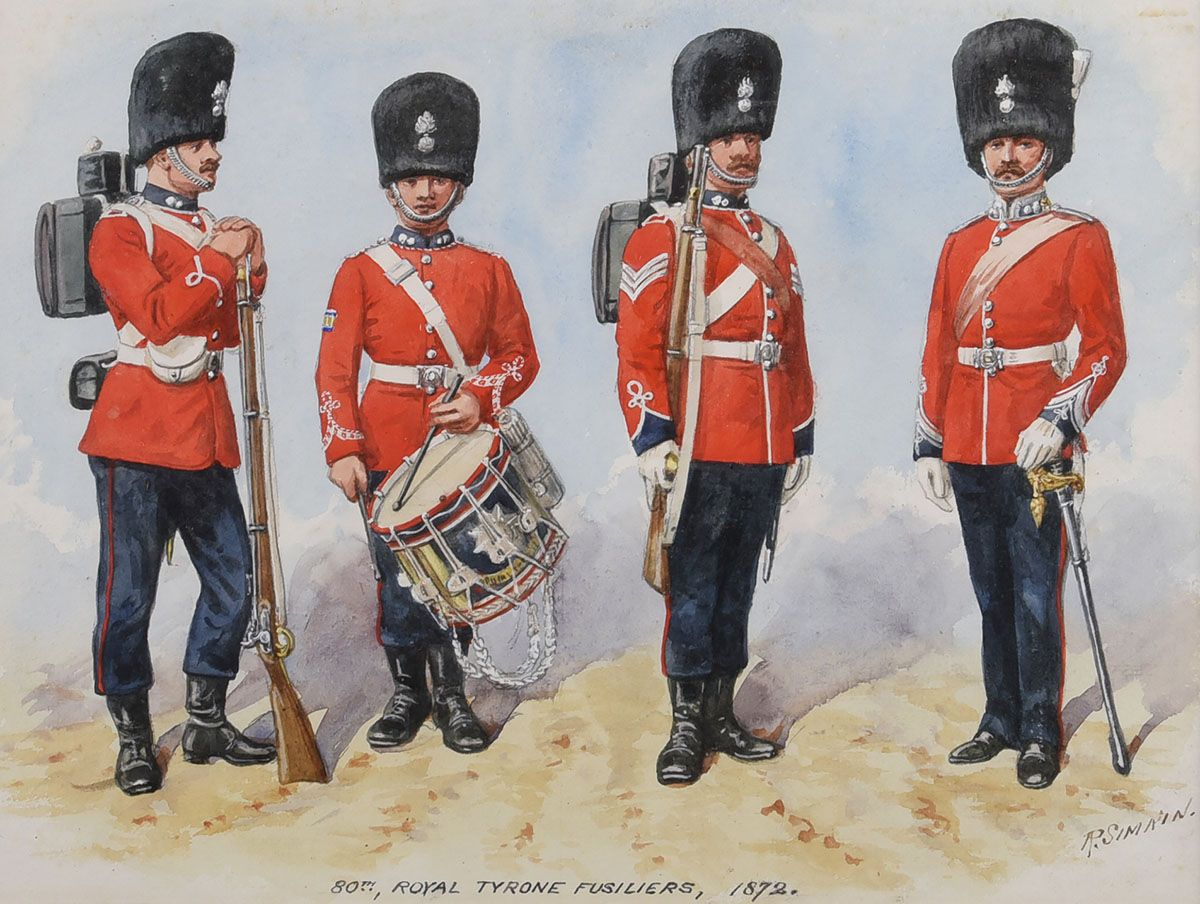
Regimental private, drummer, sergeant and officer in 1872

Under the 'Localisation of the Forces' scheme introduced by the Cardwell Reforms of 1872, militia regiments were brigaded with their local linked regular regiments. For the Royal Tyrone Fusiliers this was in Sub-District No 64 (Counties of Londonderry, Donegal, Tyrone and Fermanagh) in Belfast District of Irish Command:

- 27th (Inniskilling) Regiment of Foot
- 108th (Madras Infantry) Regiment of Foot
- Fermanagh Light Infantry Militia
- Londonderry Light Infantry Militia
- Royal Tyrone Fusiliers
- Prince of Wales's Own Donegal Militia

A Brigade Depot was formed at Omagh, the Royal Tyrones Fusiliers' headquarters, where land was leased in 1875 to build St Lucia Barracks.

Although often referred to as brigades, the sub-districts were purely administrative organisations, but in a continuation of the Cardwell Reforms a mobilisation scheme began to appear in the Army List from December 1875. This assigned regular and militia units to places in an order of battle of corps, divisions and brigades for the 'Active Army', even though these formations were entirely theoretical, with no staff or services assigned. The Royal Tyrone Militia were assigned as 'Divisional Troops' to 2nd Division, III Corps. The division would have mustered at Redhill in Surrey, England, in time of war.

=== Childers Reforms ===
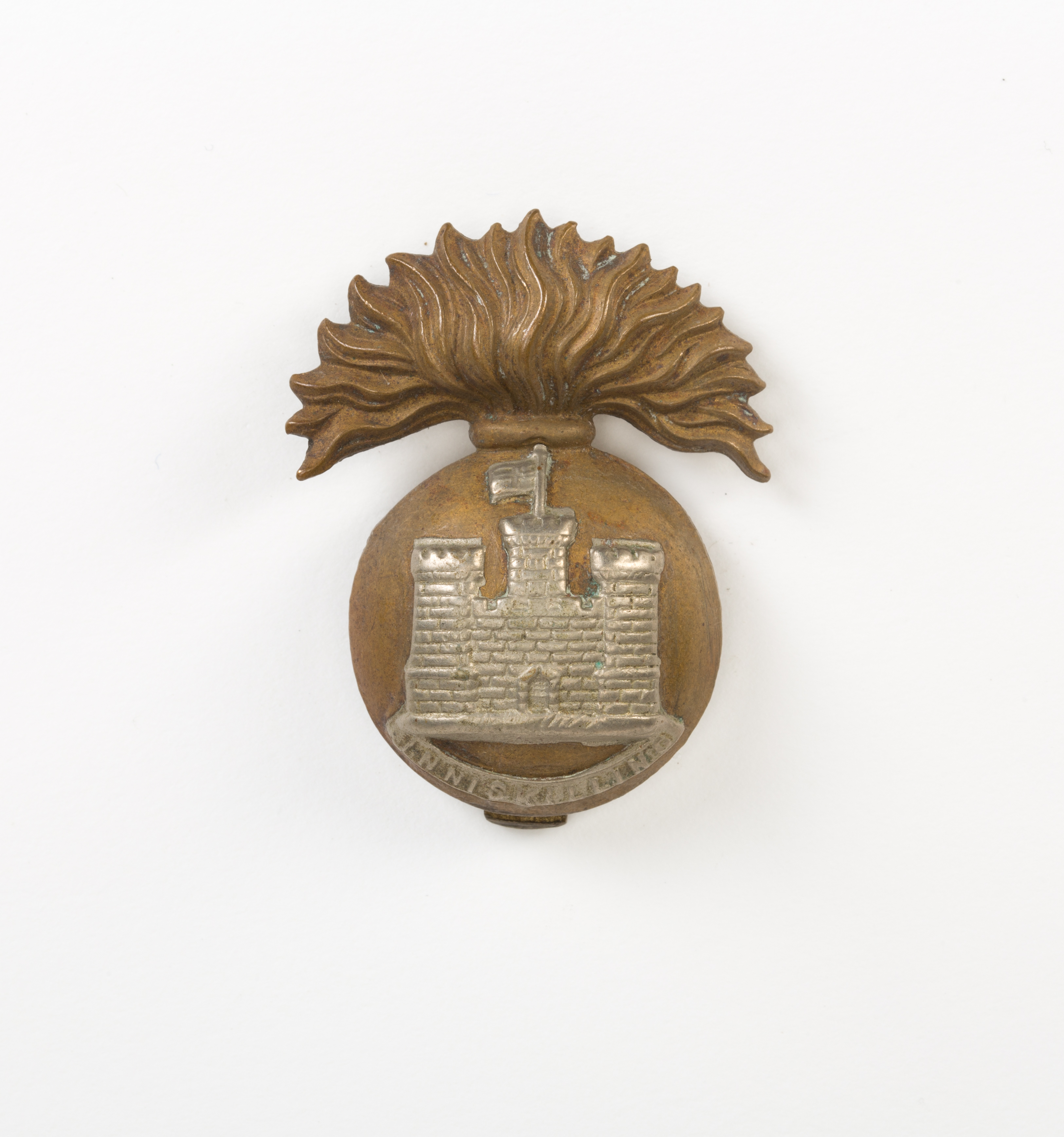
Royal Inniskilling Fusiliers' cap badge between 1881 and 1916

The Childers Reforms took Cardwell's reforms further, with the linked battalions forming single regiments. From 1 July 1881 the 27th and 108th Regiments became the 1st and 2nd Battalions of the Royal Inniskilling Fusiliers, and the militia battalions followed in numerical sequence. The Royal Tyrone Fusiliers (which contributed both the 'Royal' and 'Fusilier' elements of the new regiment's title as well as its depot) became the 5th (Royal Tyrone Militia) Battalion, Royal Inniskilling Fusiliers, on 1 July 1881 but was renumbered as the 4th Battalion in May 1882 when the Londonderry Light Infantry left the regiment on conversion to artillery.

=== Second Boer War ===
After the disasters of Black Week at the start of the Second Boer War in December 1899, most of the regular army was sent to South Africa, and many militia units were called out to replace them for home defence. The 4th Inniskillings were embodied from 2 May 1900 to 18 October 1900.

== Special Reserve ==
After the Boer War, the future of the Militia was called into question. There were moves to reform the Auxiliary Forces (Militia, Yeomanry and Volunteers) to take their place in the six Army Corps proposed by the Secretary of State for War, St John Brodrick. However, little of Brodrick's scheme was carried out. Under the more sweeping Haldane Reforms of 1908, the Militia was replaced by the Special Reserve (SR), a semi-professional force whose role was to provide reinforcement drafts for regular units serving overseas in wartime, rather like the earlier Militia Reserve. The Royal Tyrone Militia became the 3rd (Reserve) Battalion, Royal Inniskilling Fusiliers, with HQ at Omagh.

=== World War I ===
On the outbreak of World War I the battalion was embodied on 4 August 1914 at Omagh under the command of Lt-Col J.K. McClintock (commanding officer since 29 September 1909) and went to its war station at Fort Dunree on Lough Swilly. In September it was moved to Londonderry.

The battalion fulfilled its role of preparing reinforcement drafts of Reservists and Special Reservists, and later of recruits, to the regular battalions of the Inniskillings (the 1st at Gallipoli and later on the Western Front, the 2nd on the Western Front throughout the war). The Inniskillings also formed four service battalions of 'Kitchener's Army' volunteers and three more from the prewar paramilitary Ulster Volunteer Force.

On 8 October the Special Reserve battalions were ordered to form service battalions from their surplus recruits, and 3rd (Reserve) Bn should have formed a 12th (Service) Battalion. However this order was cancelled for most Irish regiments on 25 October. The 12th (Reserve) Bn was finally formed in 1915 from the depot companies of the three former UVF battalions.

About April 1918 3rd (Reserve) Bn absorbed the 4th (Extra Reserve) Bn (the former Fermanagh Light Infantry) of the SR and (on 27 May) the 12th (Reserve) Bn. In April the merged battalion moved to Oswestry in Shropshire, England, where it remained for the rest of the war as part of the West Lancashire Reserve Brigade.

=== Postwar ===
The SR resumed its old title of Militia in 1921 but like most militia units the 3rd Inniskillings remained in abeyance after World War I. By the outbreak of World War II in 1939, no officers remained listed for the 3rd Bn. The Militia was formally disbanded in April 1953.

== Commanders ==
The following served as Colonel of the Regiment:

- Lt-Col. Cmdt (later Col) John Hamilton, 1st Marquess of Abercorn, appointed 1793
- Col. Somerset Lowry-Corry, 2nd Earl Belmore, appointed November 1798
- Col. Du Pré Alexander, 2nd Earl of Caledon, appointed 11 August 1804, died April 1839
- Col. James Alexander, 3rd Earl of Caledon, appointed 1 May 1839, died 30 June 1855

The following served as Commanding Officer:

- Lt-Col Cmdt James Stronge, formerly of the 5th Dragoon Guards, appointed 20 October 1854
- Lt-Col Cmdt James Alfred Caulfield, formerly 59th Foot and Coldstream Guards, promoted 22 April 1862
- Lt-Col Cmdt Francis Ellis, promoted 30 April 1872
- Lt-Col George Perry McClintock, promoted 19 November 1881
- Lt-Col Lewis Mansergh Buchanan, formerly 88th Foot, promoted 27 December 1887
- Lt-Col Charles M. Alexander, promoted 3 November 1897
- Lt-Col Henry Irvine, promoted 30 July 1902
- Lt-Col John K. McClintock, promoted 29 September 1909

The following served as Honorary Colonel:

- Sir James Stronge, 3rd Baronet, former CO, appointed 22 April 1862
- James Caulfield, 7th Viscount Charlemont, former CO appointed 25 April 1885
- Col Henry Irvine, CB, former CO, appointed 11 July 1914

== Precedence ==
During the American War of Independence the lords-lieutenant of the English and Welsh counties had drawn lots each year to determine the relative precedence of their militia regiments. On 2 March 1793, at the outbreak of the French Revolutionary War, they drew lots again, but this time the order of precedence held good for the whole war. The Irish counties did the same on 8 August 1793 for their newly raised militia regiments: Tyrone was 2nd. The English, Welsh and Scottish counties re-balloted at the beginning of the Napoleonic War, but the Irish counties apparently retained the previous order.

In 1833 King William IV drew lots, by individual regiments, for all the militia of the United Kingdom: the Royal Tyrone Militia came 80th. This precedence was retained until the Cardwell Reforms. Most regiments paid little attention to the number, but the historian of the Royal Tyrone Fusiliers included both numbers in the title of his book.

== See also ==
- Irish Militia
- Militia (United Kingdom)
- Special Reserve
- Royal Inniskilling Fusiliers
