= Earl of Caledon =

Earldom in the Peerage of Ireland

Earldom of Caledon
- Arms: Per pale Argent and Sable, a Chevron and in base a Crescent all counterchanged, on a Canton Azure, a Harp Or, stringed Argent. Crest: An Arm in Armour embowed proper, holding a Sword proper, pommel and hilt Or. Supporters: Dexter: A Mermaid holding in the exterior hand a Mirror, all proper; Sinister: An Elephant Argent.
- Creation date: 29 December 1800
- Created by: George III
- Peerage: Peerage of Ireland
- First holder: James Alexander, 1st Viscount Caledon
- Present holder: Nicholas Alexander, 7th Earl of Caledon
- Heir apparent: Frederick Alexander, Viscount Alexander
- Subsidiary titles: Viscount Caledon; Baron Caledon
- Status: Extant
- Seat: Caledon House
- Motto: PER MARE PER TERRAS (By sea and by land)

Earl of Caledon, of Caledon in the County of Tyrone, is a title in the Peerage of Ireland. It was created in 1800 for James Alexander, 1st Viscount Caledon. He was a merchant who had made an enormous fortune in India. He also represented the constituency of Londonderry City in the Irish House of Commons. Alexander had already been created Baron Caledon in 1790 and Viscount Caledon, of Caledon in the County of Tyrone, in 1797, also in the Peerage of Ireland. In 1784, James Alexander purchased a city house in Dublin at Rutland Square (now Parnell Square) where he lived when serving as an MP for Derry.

He was succeeded by his son, the second Earl. He was the first Governor of the Cape Colony and sat in the House of Lords as an Irish representative peer from 1804 to 1839. His son, the third Earl, briefly represented County Tyrone in the House of Commons as a Tory and was an Irish Representative Peer between 1841 and 1855. His eldest son, the fourth Earl, sat in the House of Lords as an Irish Representative Peer from 1877 to 1898. He was succeeded by his eldest son, the fifth Earl. He never married and was succeeded by his nephew, the 6th Earl. He was the son of the Hon. Herbrand Charles Alexander, second son of the fourth Earl. Today the titles are held by his only son, the seventh Earl, who succeeded in 1980. Lord Caledon was made Lord Lieutenant of County Armagh in 1989.

The family's lineage can be traced to Captain Andrew Alexander, of Errigal, County Donegal, who was granted lands at Ballyclose near Limavady, County Londonderry, in 1663 and was later attainted by the parliament called by James II in Dublin in 1689. He had a son, Jacob Alexander, who was the ancestor of the Alexanders of Ahilly (Donegal), by his first wife, a Miss Phillips, who was a relative of the Alexanders, and by his second wife, Miss Hillhouse, he had a son, John Alexander, who married Anne White, daughter of John White, of Cadyhill, County Londonderry, and had four children. His second son Nathaniel Alexander was born in 1689 and became an Alderman of the city of Derry in 1755 and died on 22 September 1761, having had with other children a third son, James Alexander, who became the 1st Earl of Caledon.

The style Viscount Alexander is used as a courtesy title for the Earl's eldest son and heir apparent.

The family seat is Caledon House, also called Caledon Castle, near Caledon in County Tyrone, Northern Ireland.

== Baron Caledon (1790) ==
- James Alexander, 1st Baron Caledon (1730–1802)

=== Viscount Caledon (1797) ===
- James Alexander, 1st Viscount Caledon (1730–1802)

=== Earl of Caledon (1800) ===
- James Alexander, 1st Earl of Caledon (1730–1802)
- Du Pré Alexander, 2nd Earl of Caledon (1777–1839)
- James Du Pre Alexander, 3rd Earl of Caledon (1812–1855)
- James Alexander, 4th Earl of Caledon (1846–1898)
- Eric James Desmond Alexander, 5th Earl of Caledon (1885–1968)
- Denis James Alexander, 6th Earl of Caledon (1920–1980)
- Nicholas James Alexander, 7th Earl of Caledon (born 1955)

The heir apparent is the present holder's son, Frederick James Alexander, Viscount Alexander (born 1990).

=== Line of succession ===
- James Alexander, 1st Earl of Caledon (1730–1802)
  - Du Pré Alexander, 2nd Earl of Caledon (1777–1839)
    - James Du Pre Alexander, 3rd Earl of Caledon (1812–1855)
      - Maj. James Alexander, 4th Earl of Caledon (1846–1898)
        - Maj. Eric James Desmond Alexander Alexander, 5th Earl of Caledon (1885–1968)
        - Lt.-Col. Hon. Herbrand Charles Alexander (1888–1965)
          - Maj. Denis James Alexander, 6th Earl of Caledon (1920–1980)
            - Nicholas James Alexander, 7th Earl of Caledon (born 1955)
              - (1) Frederick James Alexander, Viscount Alexander (born 1990)
        - Field Marshal Harold Rupert Leofric George Alexander, 1st Earl Alexander of Tunis (1891–1969)
          - (2) Shane William Desmond Alexander, 2nd Earl Alexander of Tunis (born 1935)
          - (3) Hon. Brian James Alexander (born 1939)
        - Col. Hon. William Sigismund Patrick Alexander (1895–1972)
          - (4) Alastair Patrick Lindsay Alexander (born 1935)

== See also ==
- Earl Alexander of Tunis
- Cable-Alexander baronets, of Belcamp
