= James Alexander, 1st Earl of Caledon =

Irish merchant and politician

James Alexander, 1st Earl of Caledon (1730 – 22 March 1802) was an Irish merchant and politician who sat in the House of Lords as an Irish representative peer.

== An Irish 'nabob' ==
Alexander began his career in India when he arrived at Fort St. George, Madras, in 1752, at the age of twenty-three, and became a factor there. He was also employed under the Accountant for Madras, and in 1754 became Sub-Accountant and Book-Keeper of Deposits from the Mayor's Courts. He was Sheriff of Madras in 1754 and again in 1757. In the latter year he became Junior Merchant at Madras. In 1759, he was appointed Third in Council at Vizagapatam; in 1760, Senior Merchant and Third in Council at Masulipatam; and in 1762 Eleventh in Council at Fort St George, Civil and Military Paymaster, and Military Storekeeper.

He returned to Britain in 1763 only to return to India in 1766, having been appointed to Fort William, Calcutta, as Sixth Member of the Bengal Council, Import Warehouse Keeper, Custom Master and Mint Master. In a letter of introduction to someone in Madras, through which he passed in January 1767, he was described (significantly) as 'Coja Alexander' - coja meaning a wealthy merchant: '... I make no doubt you have given him every kind of curry that ever was invented at Madras. He deserves it; he deserves a great fortune, for he has a noble spirit...' In 1769, he became Fifth Member of Council, Collector General, Accountant and Custom Master, and in 1770, Third Member of Council, Chief of Patna and Chief of the Council of Revenue for Bihar. He was listed among the Nawab of Arcot's creditors in 1771. In that year he was promoted Second Member of Council and appointed Chief of the Council of Revenue at Murshidabad. He left India in 1772.

Alexander's career, in India and in the East India Company's civil service, is of particular significance in the context of his native Ireland, since it was an unusual career for a contemporary or near-contemporary Irishman to pursue. It is also significant even in the wider context of the British in India. Dr P. J. Marshall has written: "[Among the great fortunes which were amassed in Bengal before the end of the 1760s] ... were [those] made by Francis Sykes, Thomas Rumbold and James Alexander, who had all taken a rich harvest out of the early revenue administration, Sykes as Resident at Murshidabad, Rumbold at Patna, and Alexander at both. ... Alexander, one of the relatively few Irishmen in the Bengal civil service, believed that he was worth about £150,000 when he left Bengal in 1772. He acquired nearly 9,000 acres (36 km^{2}) in Ulster, from which he hoped to derive an annual income of some £7,000, and became the 1st Lord Caledon. ...'.

== The Caledon Estate ==
In 1776, Alexander purchased the Caledon estate in County Tyrone and County Armagh for £96,400 from Edmund Boyle, 7th Earl of Cork and Orrery, whose father had acquired it by marriage into the Hamilton family of Caledon in 1738. Alexander had already acquired property nearer his native Derry: the house and demesne of Boom Hall, outside the city, the Churchland estate of Moville, County Donegal, and a fee simple estate near Ballycastle, County Antrim. The Caledon estate was extended by piecemeal purchases of adjoining townlands and by the leasing of other adjoining townlands belonging to the Archbishop of Armagh.

== Family and political life ==
Alexander married Anne Crawford, daughter of James Crawford of Crawfordsburn, County Down, on 28 November 1774, and had issue:

- Mabella Alexander (7 August 1775 – 4 March 1854), who married Andrew Thomas Blayney, 11th Baron Blayney, and had issue.
- Du Pré Alexander, 2nd Earl of Caledon (14 December 1777 – 8 April 1839)

After his return from India for the final time in 1772, and having purchased the Caledon estate, Alexander entered politics. He served as Member of Parliament for Londonderry City from 1775 to 1790 and was appointed High Sheriff of Tyrone in 1780 and High Sheriff of Armagh in 1781. Alexander was a staunch Tory in his politics and had spent the staggering sum of over £600,000 on acquiring estates in Ireland, including the parliamentary borough of Newtownards in County Down, and became a strenuous supporter of the Act of Union.

Alexander entered the Peerage of Ireland as Baron Caledon, of Caledon, in the County of Tyrone, on 6 June 1790 and was subsequently created Viscount Caledon on 23 November 1797 and finally Earl of Caledon on 29 December 1800, on the day that 18 Irish peerages were conferred on persons who already possessed a peerage of that kingdom.

Lord Caledon died at his house in Rutland Square (now Parnell Square), Dublin, on 22 March 1802 aged 72. Lady Caledon had predeceased him on 21 December 1777.

Parliament of Ireland
| Preceded by Francis Andrews; Hugh Hill | Member of Parliament for Londonderry City; 1775–1790; With: Hugh Hill | Succeeded by William Lecky; Sir Hugh Hill, 1st Bt |
Peerage of Ireland
| New creation | Earl of Caledon; 1800–1802 | Succeeded by Du Pré Alexander |
| New creation | Viscount Caledon; 1797–1802 | Succeeded by Du Pré Alexander |
| New creation | Baron Caledon; 1790–1802 | Succeeded by Du Pré Alexander |
