= Nicholas Alexander, 7th Earl of Caledon =

Northern Irish noble

The Right Honourable The Earl of Caledon KCVO JP
- Born: 6 May 1955 (age 71)
- Spouses: Wendy Coumantaros (m. 1979; div. 1985) Henrietta Newman (m. 1989; div. bef. 2008) Amanda Cayzer (m. 2008)
- Issue: 2
- Parents: Denis Alexander, 6th Earl of Caledon; Anne Louise, Freiin de Graevenitz

Nicholas James Alexander, 7th Earl of Caledon (born 6 May 1955), is the Lord Lieutenant of County Armagh, Northern Ireland, UK.

== Life ==
Alexander is the son of Denis Alexander, 6th Earl of Caledon (1920–1980) and his wife Anne Louise, (who died in 1963), a daughter of Freiherr Nicolai de Graevenitz. He was educated at Gordonstoun in Elgin, Scotland.

He succeeded his father in 1980, but the Caledon earldom in the Peerage of Ireland did not carry a seat in the House of Lords. He has been Lord Lieutenant of County Armagh since 1989 and is a justice of the peace. He was appointed Knight Commander of the Royal Victorian Order (KCVO) in the 2015 New Year Honours. He became Chairman of the Prince's Trust in Northern Ireland in 2019. He was one of the peers carrying the Royal Standards at the 2023 Coronation. He was invited to ride in the King's procession at Royal Ascot 2023.

He lives at Caledon House, County Tyrone, Northern Ireland.

=== Family ===
Caledon has two sisters: Lady Tana Focke (born 1945) and Lady Elizabeth Jane Alexander (born 1962).

In 1979, he married Wendy Catherine Coumantaros, daughter of Spiro Coumantaros, and they were divorced in 1985. He married Henrietta Mary Alison Newman, daughter of John Newman, of Compton Chamberlayne, in 1989, and before divorcing in 2000 they had two children, Frederick James Alexander, Viscount Alexander (born 15 October 1990) and Lady Leonora Jane Alexander (born 26 May 1993).. He married Amanda Cayzer, née Squire, in 2008.

Honorary titles
Preceded by Michael Torrens-Spence	Lord Lieutenant of Armagh; 1989–present	Incumbent
Peerage of Ireland
Preceded by Denis Alexander	Earl of Caledon; 1980–present	Incumbent
