= James Alexander, 3rd Earl of Caledon =

James Du Pre Alexander, 3rd Earl of Caledon (27 July 1812 – 30 June 1855), styled Viscount Alexander from birth until 1839, was a soldier and politician.

== Early life ==
Born into an Ulster-Scots aristocratic family in London, he was the son of the 2nd Earl of Caledon and Lady Catherine Yorke. He was educated from 1824 to 1828 at Eton College and then at Christ Church, Oxford.

== Career ==
He was appointed High Sheriff of Armagh in 1836, and was Member of Parliament for County Tyrone between 1837 and 1839. He succeeded to the title of Earl of Caledon on the death of his father on 8 April 1839. He was then elected to the House of Lords as a Representative Peer for Ireland in 1841. He gained the rank of captain in the Coldstream Guards and was Colonel of the Royal Tyrone Militia from 1 May 1839 (in succession to his father) until his death.

== Personal life ==
On 4 September 1845 at St. Michael's, St. Albans, Hertfordshire, he married Lady Jane Frederica Harriot Mary Grimston, daughter of James Grimston, 1st Earl of Verulam, and Lady Charlotte Jenkinson. They had three sons and one daughter:

- James Alexander, 4th Earl of Caledon (1846–1898), who married Lady Elizabeth Graham-Toler, a daughter of Hector Graham-Toler, 3rd Earl of Norbury.
- Hon. Walter Philip Alexander (1849–1934), a Lt.-Col. in the 2nd Dragoons who served in the Second Boer War from 1899 to 1900; he married Margaret Katherine Grimston, daughter of Rev. the Hon. Francis Grimston (a son of the 1st Earl of Verulam).
- Lady Jane Charlotte Elizabeth Alexander (1850–1941), who married Capt. Edmund Barker Van Koughnet, a son of the Hon. Philip Michael Matthew Scott VanKoughnet, former Chancellor of Ontario.
- Hon. Charles Alexander (1854–1909), a Major in the 3rd Battalion, Royal Inniskilling Fusiliers; he married Kate Stayner, daughter of Charles Stayner, of Halifax, in 1880.

Lord Caledon died at the age of 42 at his house in Carlton House Terrace, London, on 30 June 1855 and was buried at Caledon in County Tyrone, Ireland. Lady Caledon died on 30 March 1888.

Parliament of the United Kingdom
Preceded by Henry Lowry-Corry; Lord Claud Hamilton	Member of Parliament for County Tyrone; 1837–1839; With: Henry Lowry-Corry	Succeeded by Henry Lowry-Corry; Lord Claud Hamilton
Political offices
Preceded by The Earl of Rosse	Representative peer for Ireland; 1841–1855	Succeeded by The Earl of Portarlington
Peerage of Ireland
Preceded by Du Pré Alexander	Earl of Caledon; 1839–1855	Succeeded by James Alexander
Preceded by Du Pré Alexander	Viscount Caledon; 1839–1855	Succeeded by James Alexander
Preceded by Du Pré Alexander	Baron Caledon; 1839–1855	Succeeded by James Alexander
