= Eric Alexander, 5th Earl of Caledon =

British Army officer, and Irish peer (1885–1968)

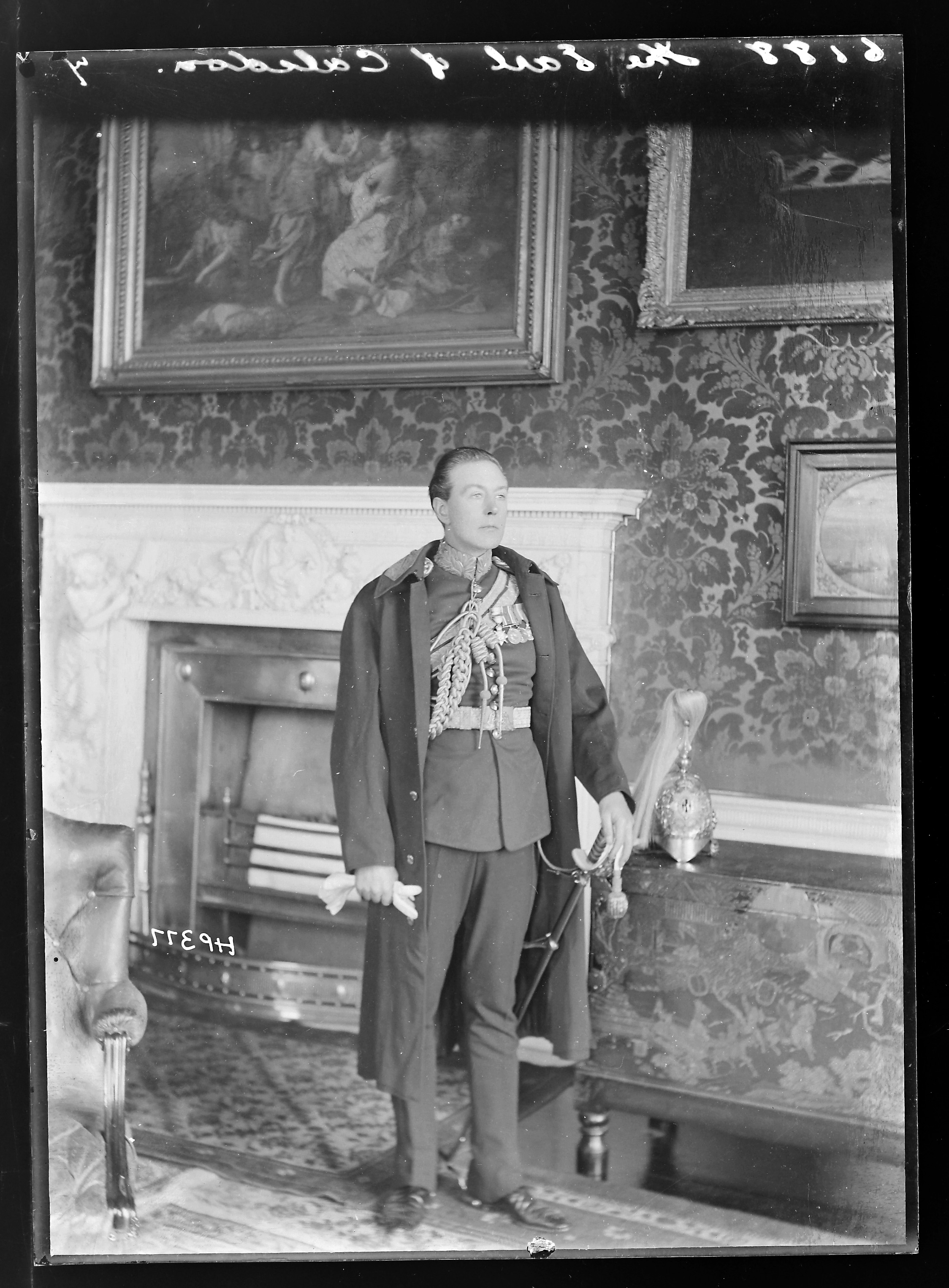
The 5th Earl of Caledon in 1932

Eric James Desmond Alexander, 5th Earl of Caledon (9 August 1885 – 10 July 1968) was a soldier and the eldest son of James Alexander, 4th Earl of Caledon and his wife, Lady Elizabeth Graham-Toler.

== Early life ==
He was born at his family's home in Carlton House Terrace, London, and succeeded to the title of Earl of Caledon upon the death of his father in 1898. He went to Eton College from 1899 to 1903, and then to Trinity College, Cambridge. He was one of the pages at the coronation of Edward VII in 1910.

== Military service ==
Lord Caledon fought and was wounded in the First World War, served in the Baltic from 1919 to 1921, and gained the rank of Major in the service of his father's regiment, the 1st Life Guards.

== Personal life ==
Giving an interesting insight into the period, Mark Bence-Jones writes: "Her [Lady Caledon, his mother] eldest son Eric, now the Earl of Caledon, was unmarried. He had a lady-love, a marchioness with a husband and children; his mother would not have her at Caledon, so when she came to visit him she stayed at Glaslough, being given the best guest bedroom, the Mauve Room. Unfortunately for the Leslies she injured her leg motoring while she was here and was laid up in the Mauve Room for weeks, with the lovesick Eric walking over for every meal."

The Earl of Caledon was multiple times fined for reckless driving, sometimes in connection with his chauffeur, and in December 1909 he was fined for aiding and abetting his chauffeur in driving an unregistered motor-car in Hampton-place, Piccadilly which had been involved in a collision with a bus in Hamilton-place. He was also involved in a legal dispute with his mother, the Dowager Countess, over the ownership of an early copy of Holbein's Portrait of Thomas Cromwell which had apparently been sold to an American for £30,000 in 1914.

== Death and legacy ==
Lord Caledon died unmarried in Belfast on 10 July 1968, aged 82. The funeral took place on 16 July in the family vault in Caledon churchyard. The Archbishop of Armagh, James McCann, took part in the service with other clerics of the Church of Ireland.

A prominent Irish landowner, Lord Caledon died with about 30,000 acres. The family estate was subsequently broken down to 3,000 acres and narrowly avoided complete break-up when inherited by the late Earl's nephew, Denis James Alexander, 6th Earl of Caledon.

Peerage of Ireland
| Preceded by James Alexander | Earl of Caledon; 1898–1968 | Succeeded by Denis Alexander |
