= James Alexander, 4th Earl of Caledon =

British Army soldier, nobleman, and politician

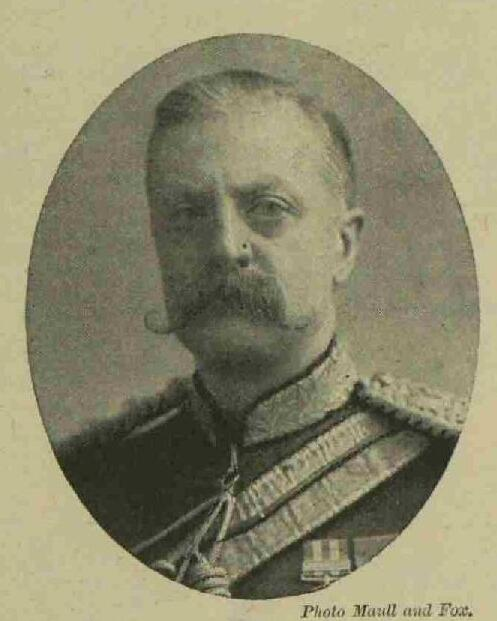
- Born: 11 July 1846; Westminster
- Died: 27 April 1898 (aged 51)
- Spouse(s): Lady Elizabeth Graham-Toler
- Children: 4, including Eric Alexander and Harold Alexander
- Parent(s): James Alexander, 3rd Earl of Caledon; Jane Grimston
- Awards: Knight of St. Patrick

James Alexander, 4th Earl of Caledon, KP, DL (11 July 1846 – 27 April 1898), styled Viscount Alexander from birth until 1855, was a soldier and politician.

== Early life ==
He was born at his family's home in Carlton House Terrace, London on 11 July 1846. He was the eldest son of James Du Pre Alexander, 3rd Earl of Caledon and his wife, Lady Jane Grimston.

He was educated at Harrow and Christ Church, Oxford. He succeeded to the title Earl of Caledon at the age of nine upon the death of his father in 1855.

== Career ==
Lord Caledon was elected to sit in the House of Lords as an Irish representative peer in 1877 and was Deputy Lieutenant of County Tyrone. He gained the rank of captain in the service of the 1st Life Guards, became a major serving with the 4th Battalion, Royal Inniskilling Fusiliers and fought in the Egyptian Campaign in 1882. He was also invested as a Knight of the Order of St Patrick on 14 November 1896.

== Personal life ==
He married Lady Elizabeth Graham-Toler, daughter of Hector Graham-Toler, 3rd Earl of Norbury, on 9 October 1884 and had four sons:

- Eric Alexander, 5th Earl of Caledon (1885–1968), who succeeded to the title but was unmarried, and died without children.
- Hon. Herbrand Charles Alexander (1888–1965), father of the 6th Earl.
- Hon. Harold Alexander, later 1st Earl Alexander of Tunis (1891–1969), a Field Marshal.
- Hon. William Sigismund Patrick Alexander (1895–1972).

Lord Caledon died on 27 April 1898 at the age of 51 in Curzon Street, Mayfair, London, from blood poisoning and pneumonia. He was buried at Caledon, County Tyrone. Lady Caledon died on 6 October 1939.

Lord Caledon owned 29,000 acres in Tyrone.

Peerage of Ireland
Preceded by James Alexander	Earl of Caledon; 1855–1898	Succeeded by Eric Alexander
Political offices
Preceded by The Lord Headley	Representative peer for Ireland; 1877–1898	Succeeded by The Lord Farnham
