= Eric Alexander (footballer) =

Scottish footballer

Eric Alexander, born 3 April 1960, was a Scottish footballer who played midfield for Fairholm, Hamilton Academical and Larkhall Thistle.

Alexander joined Hamilton from Fairholm on 16 April 1977 and made his debut against Montrose on the same day losing 2–0. He scored his first league goal against Raith Rovers on 19 January 1980 in a 1–1 draw at home. According to a Celtic match day programme from when they played the Accies on 24 September 1980 at Celtic Park, Alexander was "a very skilful player, shows great composure under pressure and must surely have a big future in the game". Over the course of his tenure with the Accies, he got 7 goals from 154 starts and 12 substitute appearances. He played with the club until May 1982.

Alexander then joined Larkhall Thistle and in 1987 made the Scottish junior squad for a match in Dublin.
