= Erik K. Alexander =

American medical researcher

Erik K. Alexander (born May 18, 1971) is an American medical educator and practicing clinician. He is Vice President of Education for Brigham Health, and Harvard Medical School Associate Dean for Medical Education (BWH). In 2011, he joined the board of directors of the American Thyroid Association. Alexander is a Professor of Medicine in the Department of Medicine at Harvard Medical School (HMS), and is the Executive Director of the Brigham Education Institute (BEI) and Undergraduate Medical Education (medical student education) at Brigham and Women's Hospital (BWH) in Boston, Massachusetts.

Alexander is co-Chairman of the Brigham and Women's Hospital Education Committee on Teaching and Education, and Director of the Brigham and Women's Hospital Principal Clinical Experience.

Alexander is Chief of the Thyroid Section at Brigham and Women's Hospital. He is co-Chairman of the 2017 American Thyroid Association national clinical guidelines on the treatment of Thyroid Disease during Pregnancy. His work investigating thyroid physiology during pregnancy has helped to define treatment paradigms designed to prevent maternal hypothyroidism and its consequences.
