= Caledon House =

House in County Tyrone, Northern Ireland

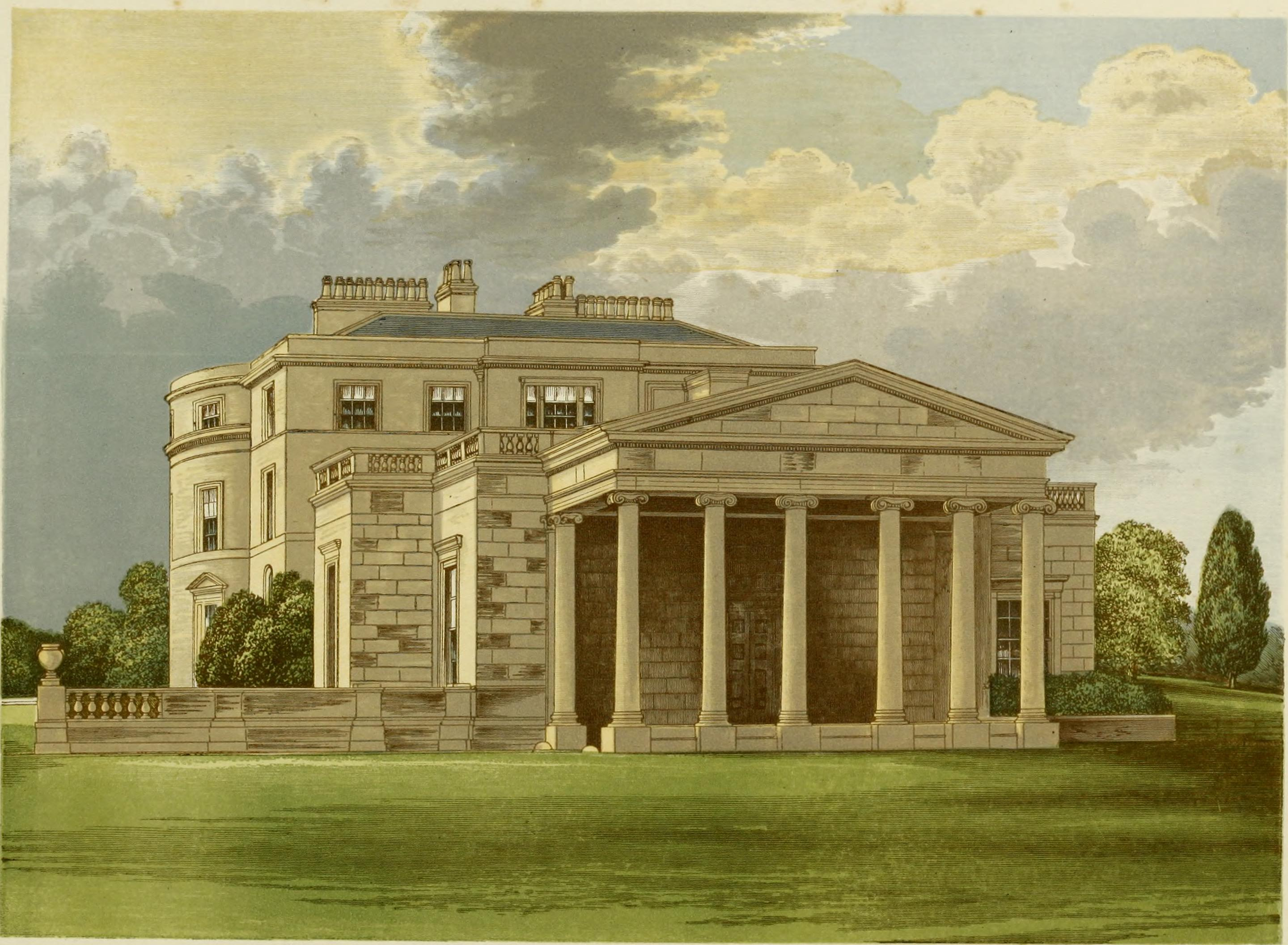
- View of Caledon House (1840)
- Interactive map of Caledon House
- 54°20′6″N 6°50′48″W
- Location: Caledon, County Tyrone, Northern Ireland

Site notes
- Area: 3,000 acres (1,200 ha)

Listed Building – Grade A
- Designated: 7 March 1977
- Reference no.: HB13/10/004

Caledon House, also called Caledon Castle, is a country house near the town of Caledon, County Tyrone, Northern Ireland. Caledon House sits on the private 3,000-acre woodland estate of the Earls of Caledon. For more than 200 years, the estate has been maintained as the private home of the aristocratic Alexander family.

== Terrorism ==
Caledon Castle was attacked multiple times during The Troubles.

== Contemporary ==
In 2015, Caledon Castle was opened to the public for first time in twenty years.

== See also ==
- Listed building
