= Caledon, County Tyrone =

Village in County Tyrone, Northern Ireland

Coordinates: 54.35°N 6.833°W

Caledon: Irish: Cionn Aird
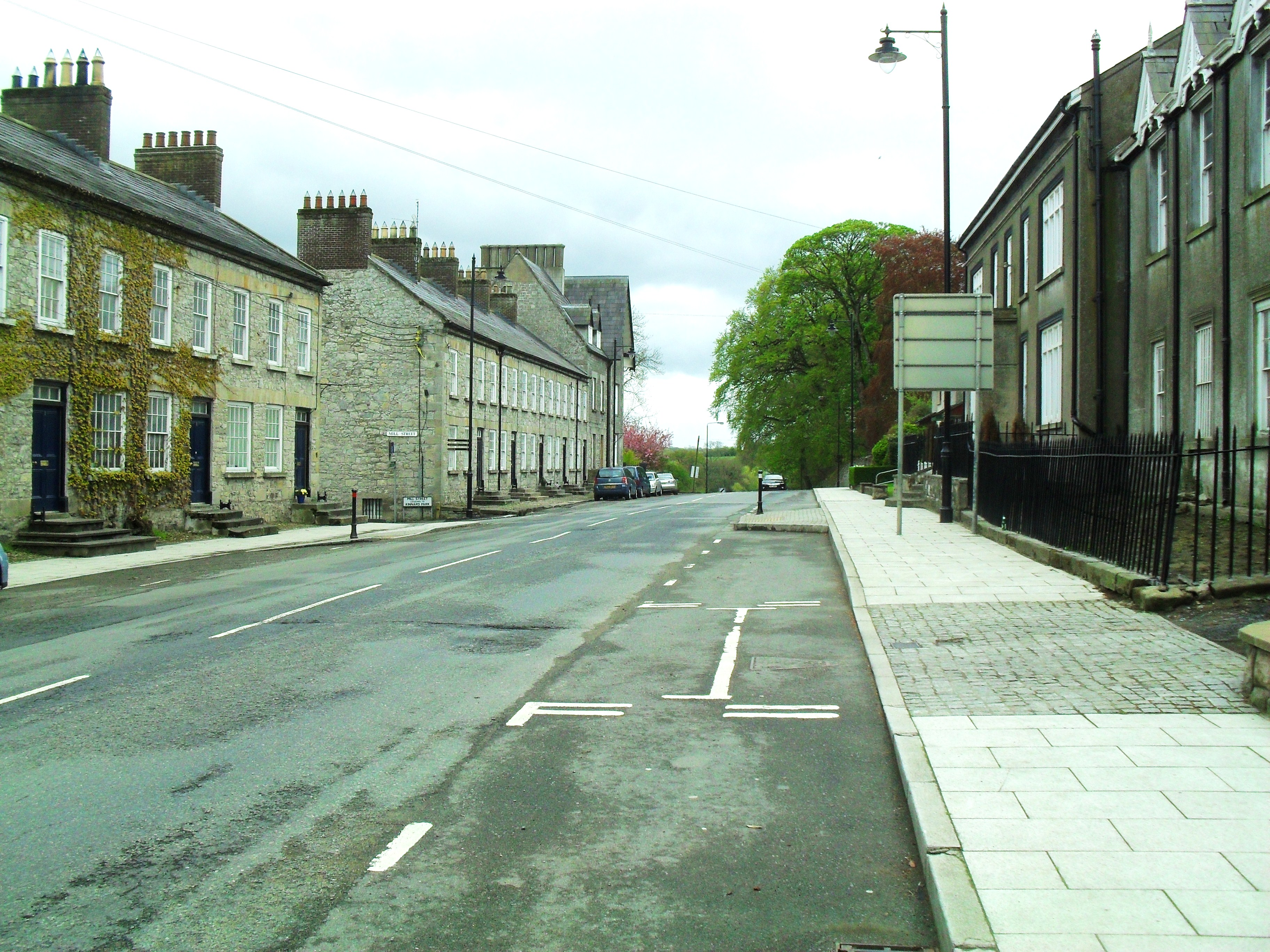
- Mill Street, Caledon

- Location within Northern Ireland
- Population: 522 (2021 Census)
- Irish grid reference: H755453
- District: Mid Ulster
- County: County Tyrone
- Country: Northern Ireland
- Sovereign state: United Kingdom
- Post town: CALEDON
- Postcode district: BT68
- Dialling code: 028
- UK Parliament: Fermanagh and South Tyrone
- NI Assembly: Fermanagh and South Tyrone

Caledon (/ˈkælɪdɪn/) is a small village in County Tyrone, Northern Ireland. It is in the Clogher Valley on the banks of the River Blackwater, 10 km west of Armagh, near the border with the Republic of Ireland. In the 2021 Census it had a population of 522 people. It is a designated conservation area. Caledon was originally called Kinaird (from Irish Cionn Aird 'head/top of the hill'), until renamed in 1779 after Caledon House.

== History ==
The village was the site of a castle of the O'Neills of Kinard, a Gaelic clan. During the Nine Years' War (1594–1603), this small branch of the O'Neills served on the side of the Crown. They were rewarded by having their land at Kinard granted to them directly by the Crown, outside of Tyrone's overlordship. In 1608, the castle and settlement of Kinard were burned by the forces of Sir Cahir O'Doherty, during O'Doherty's Rebellion. Sir Henry Óg O'Neill and his son Turlough McHenry O'Neill were killed by the rebels.

During the early 17th century Plantation of Ulster, the area was colonized by settlers from Britain. Felim O'Neill of Kinard, son of Turlough McHenry, was the main leader of the Irish Rebellion of 1641.

In 1967 the Gildernew family, began a protest about discrimination in housing allocation by 'squatting' (illegally occupying) in a house in Caledon. The house had been allocated by Dungannon Rural District Council to a 19-year-old unmarried Ulster Protestant woman, Emily Beattie, who was the secretary of a local Ulster Unionist Party politician. Beattie was given the house ahead of older married Catholic families with children. The protesters were evicted by officers of the Royal Ulster Constabulary, one of whom was Beattie's brother. The next day, the annual conference of the Nationalist Party unanimously approved of the protest action by Currie.

=== Caledon House ===
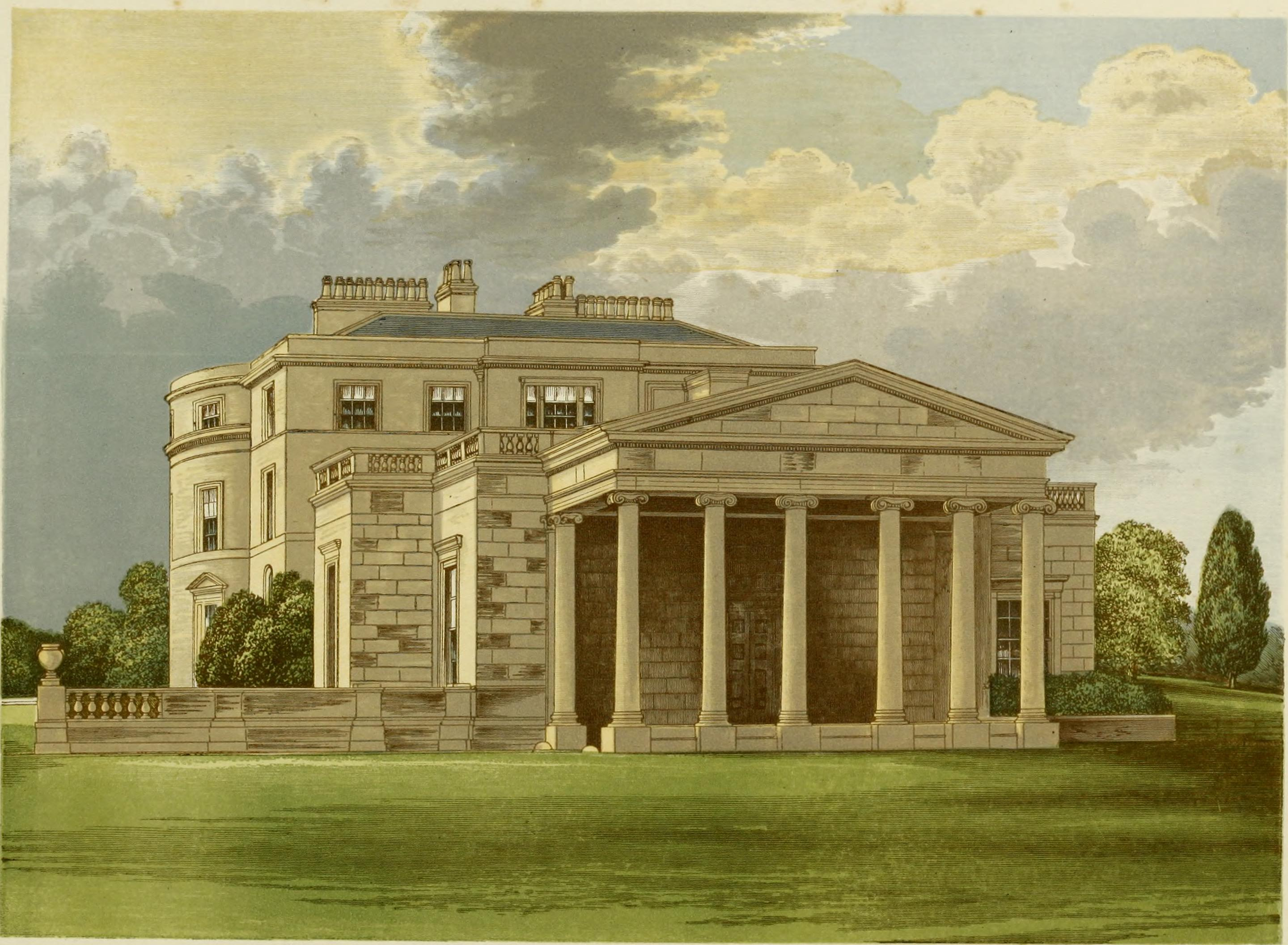
Caledon, from, A series of picturesque views of seats of the noblemen and gentlemen of Great Britain and Ireland (1840)

Caledon House was built in 1779 by James Alexander, a member of the Irish House of Commons for Londonderry, who had previously in 1778 bought the Caledon Estate. James Alexander was made Baron Caledon in 1790 and later Viscount Caledon in 1797. The House was begun in 1779 to designs by Thomas Cooley, but altered by John Nash in 1808–10. The village of Kinaird was renamed Caledon after the house and estate. The name "appears to be from Caledonia, an archaic Roman name for Scotland".

== Transport ==
Caledon railway station (on the narrow gauge Clogher Valley Railway) opened on 2 May 1887, but finally closed on 1 January 1942. Tynan and Caledon railway station on the mainline opened by the Ulster Railway on 25 May 1858. In 1876 the Ulster Railway merged with other railway companies to become the Great Northern Railway (Ireland). The station was finally closed on 1 October 1957.

== Education ==
Local schools include Churchill Primary School and St. Joseph's Primary School.

== Sport ==
Caledon Rovers F.C. are the local football team of Caledon. They play in the Mid-Ulster Football League. Established in 1998, they have had trophy success, having lifted the Armstrong Cup in 2017.

== Demography ==
=== 19th century population ===
The population of the village decreased during the 19th century:

Year	1841	1851	1861	1871	1881	1891
Population	1046	999	825	579	562	703
Houses	183	172	155	120	131	151

=== 21st century population ===
On Census day (29 April 2001) there were 387 people living in Caledon. Of these:

- 31.0% were under 16 years old and 16.2% were aged 60 and over;
- 47.9% of the population were male and 52.1% were female;
- 35.1% were from a Catholic community background
- 60.0% were from a 'Protestant and Other Christian (including Christian related)' community background.

== Caledon townland ==
The village of Caledon is in a townland of the same name. The townland is in the historic barony of Dungannon Lower and the civil parish of Aghaloo and covers an area of 232 acres. The population of the townland declined during the 19th century:

Year	1851	1861	1871	1881	1891
Population	28	28	38	25	16
Houses	5	5	10	7	4

The townland contains one Scheduled Historic Monument: a Beam engine (grid ref: H7581 4521).

== People ==
- The village is home to the 7th Earl of Caledon and the Alexander family; previously, the village was home to Sir Felim O'Neill, the leader of the Irish Rebellion of 1641.
- John Foster McCreight (1827–1913) was a jurist and the first Premier of the Canadian province of British Columbia. He was born in Caledon to a well-established and well-connected family.
- Brian McCoy (1942–1975), was a trumpet player with the Miami Showband. McCoy was one of the three band members killed when the group was ambushed at a bogus military checkpoint outside Newry by the Glenanne gang, an outfit composed of loyalist paramilitaries and members of the British army.
- Carla O'Brien, senior journalist with RTÉ in Dublin; also a champion Irish dancer.

== Sources ==
- Casway, Jerrold (1984). Owen Roe O'Neill and the Struggle for Catholic Ireland. Philadelphia: University of Pennsylvania. ISBN 0-8122-7895-X.
- McCavitt, John (2002). The Flight of the Earls. Dublin: Gill & MacMillan. ISBN 978-0-7171-3047-4.
