= Sir Andrew Ferguson, 1st Baronet =

Anglo-Irish banker and politician (1761–1808)

Sir Andrew Ferguson, 1st Baronet (7 October 1761 – 17 July 1808) was an Anglo-Irish banker and politician.

Ferguson was High Sheriff of Londonderry City in 1786 and Mayor of Derry City from 1796 to 1797. He was the Member of Parliament for Londonderry City in the Irish House of Commons between 1798 and the Acts of Union 1800. On 7 October 1801 he was made a baronet, of the City of Londonderry in the Baronetage of Ireland.

Ferguson married Elizabeth, daughter of the Derry merchant Robert Alexander, who was the brother of the James Alexander, 1st Earl of Caledon. He was succeeded in his title by his son, Robert Ferguson.

Parliament of Ireland
Preceded by Henry Alexander; Sir George Hill, Bt	Member of Parliament for Londonderry City; 1798-1800; With: Henry Alexander	Succeeded by Replaced by Londonderry City
Baronetage of the United Kingdom
New creation	Baronet (of the City of Londonderry); 1801-1808	Succeeded by Robert Ferguson
