= 1872 Londonderry City by-election =

UK Parliamentary by-election

The Londonderry City by-election of 1872 was held on 23 November following the resignation of incumbent Liberal Party member of parliament Richard Dowse to become a Baron of the Exchequer. The Liberal vote was split as their candidate, Christopher Palles, was considered by Catholics as a "priest-hunter" for his prosecution of clergy as Attorney-General and denounced by Protestants for his views on education along denominational lines. The election was won by the Irish Conservative Party's Charles Lewis who secured a 174-vote majority. The election was the first Irish election to the British Parliament to be held by secret ballot.

== Background ==
Richard Dowse was a Liberal Party politician who was first elected to the House of Commons of the United Kingdom for the Londonderry City constituency at the 17 November 1868 general election. A lawyer, Dowse had been appointed Solicitor-General for Ireland in February 1870, an appointment that, under the law of the time, triggered a ministerial by-election. Dowse stood in the by-election of 15 February and received 680 votes, defeating a challenge from Robert Baxter of the Irish Conservative Party, who received 592. This was considered unusual in a time when such by-elections were becoming increasingly uncontested.

Dowse later became Attorney-General for Ireland and on 1 November 1872 Dowse was appointed a Baron of the Exchequer, necessitating his resignation from the House of Commons. A by-election was held on 27 November 1872 to select a new member.

== Candidates ==
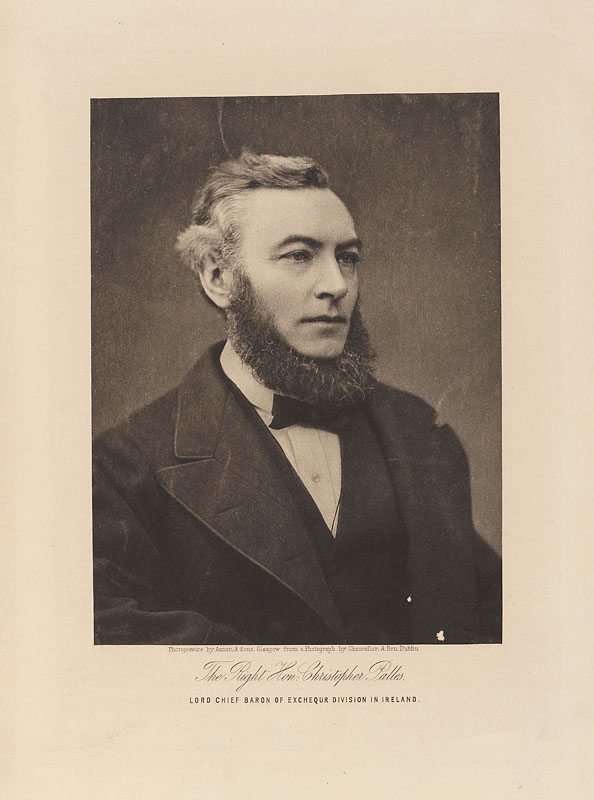
Christopher Palles, pictured later in his career

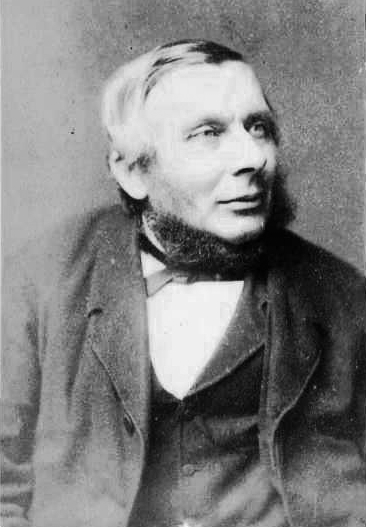
Joseph Biggar

The Liberal Party selected Christopher Palles, who had succeeded Dowse as Attorney-General, as their candidate. Palles had previously served as Solicitor-General for Ireland, in which role he had prosecuted Catholic clergy; this upset some of his fellow Catholics who decried him as a "priest-hunter" and a "government hack". He also upset many Presbyterians (Protestants) with his support for segregation of education along denominational lines. The Ballymoney Free Press considered that the Liberal Party made a mistake in selecting Palles. The Irish Conservative Party characterised him as the candidate of Irish Catholic Archbishop of Dublin Paul Cullen. Palles eventually received the support of Francis Kelly, the Bishop of Derry, though the church initially chose to remain impartial in the by-election.

The Irish Conservative Party's candidates were Charles Lewis and Bartholomew McCorkell. Lewis had been nominated first and as a Presbyterian solicitor had been selected to capitalise on the conflict within the Liberal Party on the education issue. The local association disagreed with the decision of the Conservative Central Office to select Lewis and chose McCorkell, a local merchant, as their candidate.

The Home Rule League put up Joseph Biggar as their candidate. It was clear that Biggar had little chance of winning the seat, but his candidature threatened to further split the Catholic Liberal vote.

== Result ==
The election seems to have been fought largely on the issue of education. The election was the first parliamentary election in Ireland to be held as a secret ballot, introduced by the Ballot Act 1872.

Lewis won the seat for the Conservatives, overturning the 88-seat majority won by Dowse in 1870. Lewis secured 696 votes, Palles 522, Biggar 89, and McCorkall 2. The result was regarded as a major setback for the Liberals in Ulster, who were reduced to two members in that province. It showed evidence that the party was liable to split in areas where Protestants felt their interests were at risk, with some voting with the Conservatives. The failure of Biggar to make an impact is considered evidence that, despite the fears of some contemporaries, so-called Fenian flying columns of voters had little effect.

By-election, 27 Nov 1872: Londonderry City
Party	Candidate	Votes	%	±%
Irish Conservative	Charles Lewis	696	53.2	+7.2
Liberal	Christopher Palles	522	39.9	−14.1
Home Rule	Joseph Biggar	89	6.8	New
Irish Conservative	Bartholomew McCorkell	2	0.2	N/A
Majority		174	13.3	N/A
Turnout		1,309	80.7	−7.2
Registered electors		1,622		
Irish Conservative gain from Liberal		Swing	+10.7	
