= Sir Hugh Hill, 1st Baronet =

Sir Hugh Hill, 1st Baronet (1 January 1727 – 10 February 1795) was an Anglo-Irish politician.

Hill was High Sheriff of Londonderry City from 1751 to 1753. He was the Member of Parliament for Londonderry City in the Irish House of Commons between 1768 and his death in 1795. On 17 August 1779 he was made a baronet, of Brook Hall in the Baronetage of Ireland. Hill married Hannah McClintock and was succeeded in his title by his son, George Hill.

Parliament of Ireland
| Preceded by Francis Andrews; Henry Hamilton | Member of Parliament for Londonderry City; 1768-1795; With: Francis Andrews (1768–1775); James Alexander (1775–1790); William Lecky (1790–1795) | Succeeded by William Lecky; Sir George Hill, Bt |
Baronetage of Ireland
| New creation | Baronet (of Brook Hall); 1779-1795 | Succeeded by George Hill |
