= 1914 Londonderry City by-election =

1914 UK parliamentary by-election

The 1914 Londonderry City by-election was a Parliamentary by-election held on 30 November 1914. The constituency returned one Member of Parliament (MP) to the House of Commons of the United Kingdom, elected by the first past the post voting system.

Liberal Sir James Brown Dougherty was elected unopposed. Dougherty was the last Liberal MP elected in Ireland.

== Vacancy ==
James Hamilton, Marquis of Hamilton had been elected as a Unionist in the 1910 general election, facing Nationalist opposition. He then succeeded to the Dukedom of Abercorn, resulting in the 1913 Londonderry City by-election, where the Roman Catholic hierarchy supported the Liberal David Hogg, a 73-year-old local shirt manufacturer, the Lord Lieutenant of County Londonderry and a Protestant. Hogg died in August 1914 and the by-election was called for 30 November. Though the constituency was nominally marginal, an All-Party truce agreed following the outbreak of the First World War led to the other parties agreeing not to contest the seat and allow the Liberal Party to retain it. The press opined that the by-election would have been an exciting contest had there not been the all-party agreement.

== Previous result ==
By-Election 30 January 1913: Londonderry City Electorate
Party	Candidate	Votes	%	±%
Liberal	David Cleghorn Hogg	2,699	50.5	New
Irish Unionist	Hercules Pakenham	2,642	49.5	−1.6
Majority		57	1.0	N/A
Turnout		5,341	97.6	+4.4
Liberal gain from Irish Unionist		Swing		

== Candidate ==
The Liberals selected Sir James Brown Dougherty as their candidate. Dougherty was a Presbyterian Church in Ireland minister, a professor of Logic and English, and a civil servant.

== Result ==
By-Election 30 November 1914: Londonderry City Electorate
Party	Candidate	Votes	%	±%
Liberal	James Brown Dougherty	Unopposed	N/A	N/A
Liberal hold				

== Aftermath ==
Dougherty did not stand in the 1918 United Kingdom general election, when the seat was won by Eoin MacNeill of Sinn Féin in a contested election against Unionist and Nationalist candidates.
