= Hill baronets =

Baronetcy in the Baronetage of the United Kingdom

There have been five baronetcies created for persons with the surname Hill, one in the Baronetage of Nova Scotia, one in the Baronetage of Great Britain, one in the Baronetage of Ireland and two in the Baronetage of the United Kingdom. Three of the creations are extant as of 2008.

The Hill Baronetcy, of Waughton in the County of Haddington, was created in the Baronetage of Nova Scotia on 4 February 1707 for Scipio Hill. The title became either extinct or dormant on his death in 1729.

The Hill, later Clegg-Hill Baronetcy, of Hawkstone in the County of Shropshire, was created in the Baronetage of Great Britain on 20 January 1727. For more information on this creation, see the Viscount Hill.

The Hill Baronetcy, of Brook Hall in Londonderry, was created in the Baronetage of Ireland on 17 August 1779 for Hugh Hill, who represented Londonderry in the Irish House of Commons. The second Baronet represented the County of Londonderry in both the Irish and British House of Commons and also sat a Member of the British Parliament for the City of Londonderry. He was also Governor of St Vincent and Governor of Trinidad.

The Hill Baronetcy, of Bradford, was created in the Baronetage of the United Kingdom on 13 January 1917 for James Hill, founder and head of Sir James Hill & Sons, wool merchants, and Liberal Member of Parliament for Bradford Central.

The Hill Baronetcy, of Green Place in Stockbridge in the County of Southampton, was created in the Baronetage of the United Kingdom on 6 September 1919 for the shipping lawyer Norman Hill. The title became extinct when the second Baronet was killed in action in 1944. Rosalind Mary Theodosia Hill (1908–1997), daughter of the first Baronet, was Professor of History at the University of London.

== Hill baronets, of Waughton (1707) ==
- Sir Scipio Hill, 1st Baronet (died 1729)

== Hill, later Clegg-Hill baronets, of Hawkstone (1727) ==
- see the Viscount Hill

== Hill baronets, of Brook Hall (1779) ==
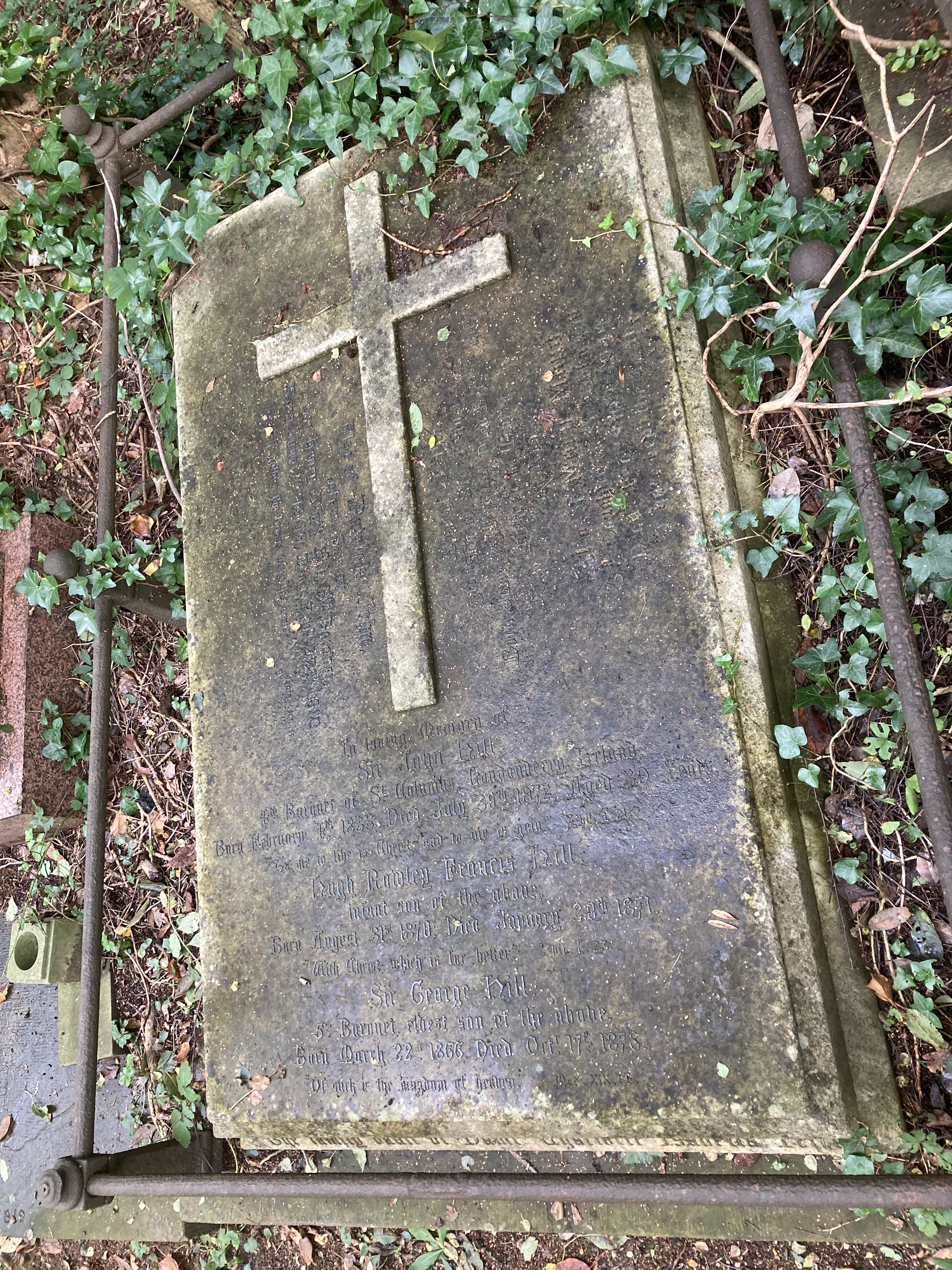
Family vault in Highgate Cemetery (west side) of the 4th and 5th Hill Baronets of Brook Hall

Escutcheon of the Hill baronets of Brook Hall

- Sir Hugh Hill, 1st Baronet (1728–1795)
- Sir George FitzGerald Hill, 2nd Baronet (1763–1839)
- Sir George Hill, 3rd Baronet (1804–1845)
- Sir John Hill, 4th Baronet (1833–1872)
- Sir George Hill, 5th Baronet (1866–1878)
- Sir Henry Blyth Hill, 6th Baronet (1867–1929)
- Sir George Rowley Hill, 7th Baronet (1864–1954)
- Sir George Cyril Rowley Hill, 8th Baronet (1890–1980)
- Sir George Alfred Rowley Hill, 9th Baronet (1899–1985)
- Sir Richard George Rowley Hill, 10th Baronet (1925–1992)
- Sir John Alfred Rowley Hill, 11th Baronet (1940–2024)
- Sir Marcus Adam James Hill, 12th Baronet (born 1974)

The heir apparent is the present holder's son Rhett Stephen Hill (born 2004).

== Hill baronets, of Bradford (1917) ==
Escutcheon of the Hill baronets of Bradford

- Sir James Hill, 1st Baronet (1849–1936)
- Sir Albert Hill, 2nd Baronet (1877–1946)
- Sir James Hill, 3rd Baronet (1905–1976)
- Sir James Frederick Hill, 4th Baronet (born 1943)

The heir apparent is the present holder's son James Lawrence Ingram Hill (born 1973).

== Hill baronets, of Green Place (1919) ==
Escutcheon of the Hill baronets of Green Place

- Sir (Arthur) Norman Hill, 1st Baronet (1863–1944)
- Sir Norman Gray Hill, 2nd Baronet (died 1944)

== See also ==
- Erskine-Hill baronets
