= High Sheriff of Londonderry =

High Sheriff of Londonderry or High Sheriff of Derry can refer to:

- High Sheriff of Londonderry City, with responsibilities in the city of Derry
- High Sheriff of County Londonderry, with responsibilities in County Londonderry outside the city of Derry
