= 1913 Londonderry City by-election =

UK parliamentary by-election

The 1913 Londonderry City by-election was a Parliamentary by-election held on 30 January 1913. The constituency returned one Member of Parliament (MP) to the House of Commons of the United Kingdom, elected by the first past the post voting system.

== Vacancy ==
The sitting Unionist MP, James Hamilton succeeded his father on his death as the Duke of Abercorn, so vacated his seat in the House of Commons to take up his seat in the House of Lords. He had been MP here since 1900.

== Previous result ==
General election December 1910 electorate 5,068
Party	Candidate	Votes	%	±%
Irish Unionist	James Hamilton	2,415	51.1	+0.5
Irish Parliamentary	Shane Leslie	2,310	48.9	−0.5
Majority		105	2.2	+1.0
Turnout		4,725	93.2	−1.8
Irish Unionist hold		Swing	+0.5	

== Candidates ==
The Unionist candidate was 50-year-old Antrim-born, London-based soldier Colonel Hercules Pakenham, whom had previously served as the commanding officer of the London Irish Rifles.

The Catholic clergy, whose authority on the choice of nationalist candidate was total, surprisingly selected Liberal David Hogg, a 73-year-old local shirt manufacturer, the Lord Lieutenant of County Londonderry and a Protestant. Hogg was selected as he had a broad appeal across the religious communities in the Londonderry City constituency and as the Lord Lieutenant, refused to appoint anybody who had signed the Ulster Covenant as a Justice of the Peace for the county.

== Campaign ==
The date of poll was set at 30 January, just 27 days after the automatic vacation of the seat. This left little time for campaigning. Hogg's election address said he was a Liberal and a supporter of the government's Home Rule Bill; he did not canvass during the election. Hogg only spoke once in the campaign at a public meeting, with the prominent Irish Home Rule politicians Charles O'Neill, Willie Redmond and Shane Leslie also attending and speaking to support Hogg's candidacy.

== Result ==
The Liberal Party gained the seat from the Irish Unionist Alliance.

Londonderry City by-election, 1913 electorate
Party	Candidate	Votes	%	±%
Liberal	David Cleghorn Hogg	2,699	50.5	New
Irish Unionist	Hercules Pakenham	2,642	49.5	−1.6
Majority		57	1.0	N/A
Turnout		5,341	97.6	+4.4
Liberal gain from Irish Unionist		Swing	N/A	

== Aftermath ==
The election gave supporters of Irish Home Rule a majority of one in the province of Ulster. Hogg was welcomed into the House of Commons during his maiden speech by the Irish Parliamentary Party and the Liberal MPs of Herbert Asquith, David Lloyd George and Winston Churchill. Hogg died in August 1914 causing another by-election at which the Liberal, Sir James Brown Dougherty was returned unopposed.
