= 1870 Londonderry City by-election =

Local election in Ireland

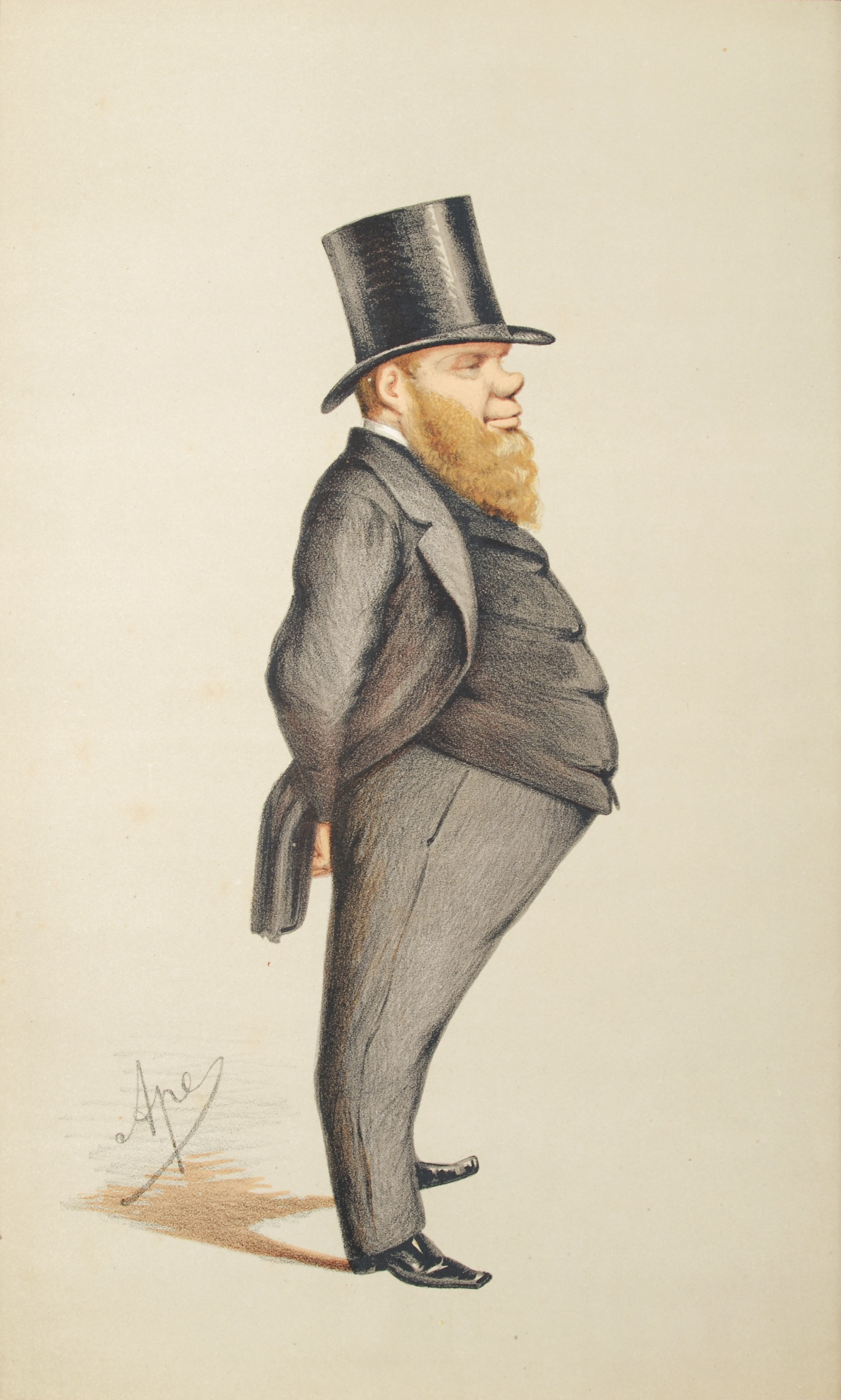
An 1871 caricature of Richard Dowse

The 1870 Londonderry City by-election was held on 15 February. It was a ministerial by-election, triggered by the appointment of Liberal Party member of parliament Richard Dowse as Solicitor-General for Ireland. The election was strongly contested by the Irish Conservative Party at a time when such by-elections were increasingly unchallenged. During this period the Catholic population of Londonderry tended to support the Liberals while the Protestant population supported the Conservatives. Dowse won, with a slightly reduced majority, and the result has been cited as evidence for the increasing co-operation between Episcopalian and Presbyterian voters in Ulster.

== Background ==
Richard Dowse was a Liberal Party politician who was first elected to the House of Commons of the United Kingdom for the Londonderry City constituency at the 17 November 1868 general election. At this election he had defeated his only rival, the Irish Conservative Party's Claud Hamilton, by 704 votes to 599.

A lawyer by profession, Dowse was appointed Solicitor-General for Ireland in February 1870 which, under the law of the time, triggered a ministerial by-election. The election was scheduled for 15 February and Dowse faced a strong challenge by the Conservative Party's Robert Baxter, at a time when ministerial by-elections (abolished in 1926) were increasingly uncontested.

== Result ==
Dowse was re-elected, receiving 680 votes compared to 592 received by Baxter. The vote in Londonderry at this time was usually sectarian with the numbers of Protestant and Catholic voters directly correlating with support for the Conservative and Liberal parties respectively. The 1870 result was regarded as indicating an increasing co-operation between Episcopalian and Presbyterian voters in Ulster. This was the last parliamentary election in the constituency before the introduction of the secret ballot in 1872 and registers of all the voters for each elector are still held on record. Dowse stood down as member of parliament in 1872 to take up a position as Baron of the Exchequer, the resulting by-election saw the loss of the seat to the Conservatives as some Liberals switched their support because of the Liberal candidate's record in government and the party's education policy.

By-election, 15 February 1870: Londonderry City
Party	Candidate	Votes	%	±%
Liberal	Richard Dowse	680	53.5	−0.5
Irish Conservative	Robert Baxter	592	46.5	+0.5
Majority		88	7.0	−1.0
Turnout		1,272	85.8	−2.1
Registered electors		1,483		
Liberal hold		Swing	−0.5	
