= Ferguson baronets =

Extinct baronetcy in the Baronetage of the United Kingdom

The Ferguson Baronetcy, of the City of Londonderry, was a title in the Baronetage of the United Kingdom. It was created on 7 October 1801 for Andrew Ferguson, who had previously represented Londonderry Borough in the Irish House of Commons. The second Baronet represented Londonderry in the British House of Commons. The title became extinct on his death in 1860.

== Ferguson baronets, of the City of Londonderry (1801) ==
- Sir Andrew Ferguson, 1st Baronet (1761–1808)
- Sir Robert Alexander Ferguson, 2nd Baronet (1796–1860)

Baronetage of the United Kingdom
Preceded by Pole baronets	Ferguson baronets of the City of Londonderry; 1 October 1801	Succeeded by Nepean baronets
