= David Hogg (Irish politician) =

Irish politician

The Right Honourable David Hogg
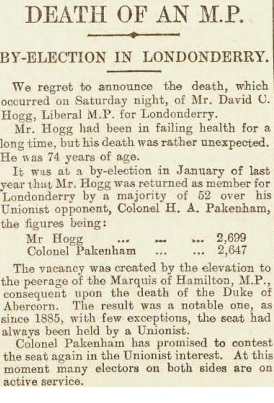
- Daily Telegraph story on his death

Londonderry City MP
- In office 30 January 1913 – 22 August 1914
- Monarch: George V
- Preceded by: James Hamilton
- Succeeded by: James Brown Dougherty

Lord Lieutenant of County Londonderry
- In office 7 January 1911 – 22 August 1914

Personal details
- Born: 1840 – 22 August 1914 (age 73–74) Scotland
- Citizenship: United Kingdom
- Party: Liberal Party

David Cleghorn Hogg JP (1840 – 22 August 1914) was a Protestant businessman and politician, originally from Scotland, but established resident in Victoria Park, Derry, County Londonderry.

== Career ==
David Hogg and his partner, Charles Mitchell, built a five-storey shirt factory in Great James Street in 1898. since converted into apartments. He became a magistrate. On 7 January 1911, he was appointed Lord Lieutenant of County Londonderry. He remained Lord Lieutenant until his death.

== Political career ==
James Hamilton, Marquis of Hamilton succeeded to the Dukedom of Abercorn, resulting in the 1913 Londonderry City by-election. Hogg was nominated as a Liberal and received the support of the Catholic clergy, despite his religion.

He defeated the Unionist candidate Hercules Arthur Pakenham by 57 votes. According to Hogg's sole speech in the House of Commons, his election address declared that he was a Liberal in favour of Home Rule for Ireland, but he had not canvassed for votes. His victory at Londonderry meant that there were a majority of Ulster MPs (17 to 16) who supported the Liberal government.

=== Election results ===
1913 Londonderry City by-election
Party	Candidate	Votes	%	±%
Liberal	David Cleghorn Hogg	2,699	50.5	+50.5
Irish Unionist	Hercules Arthur Pakenham	2,642	49.5	−1.6
Majority		57	1.0	n/a
Turnout				
Liberal gain from Irish Unionist		Swing	n/a	

== Death ==
Hogg died on 22 August 1914, leading to the 1914 Londonderry City by-election. He was the last Liberal MP elected in Ireland in a contested election; his successor Sir James Brown Dougherty was the last such elected, but he ran unopposed.

Parliament of the United Kingdom
Preceded by James Hamilton	Member of Parliament for Londonderry City; 1913 – 1914	Succeeded by James Brown Dougherty
