= 1831 Londonderry City by-election =

UK parliamentary by-election

A 1831 by-election was held in the Parliament of the United Kingdom constituency of Londonderry City between 28 March and 2 April 1831. It was held after the 1830 general election in the constituency was declared void by the House of Commons following an election petition. The grounds for the petition were that the election's winner Sir Robert Ferguson, 2nd Baronet, was also the constituency's returning officer by virtue of his position as mayor of the city. Ferguson and his 1830 opponent Captain John Richard James Hart both stood in the 1831 by-election. The result was similar to that of the preceding year and Ferguson was returned. Less than a month after the by-election, Parliament was dissolved and the 1831 United Kingdom general election was called, in which Ferguson also won.

== Background ==
Sir Robert Ferguson, 2nd Baronet, a Whig politician with conservative leanings, had been elected to the House of Commons for the Londonderry City constituency at the 1830 United Kingdom general election. The 1830 election had been held in the city between 11 and 16 August and the declared result was 258 votes for Ferguson and 87 for his Tory opponent Captain John Richard James Hart. Ferguson was the sitting mayor of Londonderry and hence was also the constituency's returning officer. Three petitions were lodged against the election, on 15, 16 and 22 November 1830 by Hart and local electors. It was alleged that Ferguson had a conflict of interest, ignored a King's Bench judgement against him and had ignored complaints about unfair conduct during the election. A committee of the House of Commons declared the election void on 14 March 1831 and issued warrants for a new election.

Hart was a noted supporter of the First Reform Bill and Ferguson, to secure votes, also pledged to support the bill. Hart's campaign was damaged by his father's opposition to the bill.

== Result ==
The election was held between 28 March and 2 April 1831 and resulted in 202 votes for Ferguson and 62 for Hart, a similar proportion to the 1830 results. Hart again alleged malpractice during the election and two further petitions were submitted on the basis that Ferguson was still legally mayor and returning officer. There were also complaints from the Catholic majority that the requirement to swear a test, repealed by the Roman Catholic Relief Act 1829, in order to become freemen and electors, deprived them of their vote.

The petitions became void upon when the Whig leader, Lord Grey, dissolved parliament on 23 April. Ferguson stood again for the constituency at the 1831 United Kingdom general election, held in Londonderry from 9 to 12 May and was again elected. Ferguson afterwards represented the Londonderry City constituency continuously until his death on 13 March 1860.

By-election, 2 April 1831: Londonderry City
| Party | Candidate | Votes | % | ±% |
|---|---|---|---|---|
| Whig | Robert Ferguson | 202 | 76.5 | +3.0 |
| Tory | John Richard James Hart | 62 | 23.5 | −1.3 |
| Majority | | 140 | 53.0 | +4.3 |
| Turnout | | 264 | c. 40.6 | c. −13.4 |
| Registered electors | | c. 650 | | |
| Whig hold | | Swing | +2.2 | |
