= Norman Hill (disambiguation) =

Norman Hill (born 1933) is an American administrator, activist and labor leader.

Norman Hill or Norm Hill may also refer to:

- Sir Norman Hill, 1st Baronet (1863–1944) of the Hill baronets
- Sir Norman Gray Hill, 2nd Baronet (died 1944) of the Hill baronets
- Norman Graham Hill (1929–1975), British racing driver and team owner
- Norm Hill (1929–after 1948), Canadian football player
- Norman Hill (cricketer) (1935–2023), English cricketer
- Norman Hill (cyclist) (1906–1996), American cyclist

== See also ==
- Norman Hill Reservoir
