= William McCormick (MP) =

Irish politician

William McCormick MP

Member of Parliament for Londonderry City
- In office 2 April 1860 – 17 July 1865
- Preceded by: Robert Ferguson
- Succeeded by: Richard Dowse

Personal details
- Born: 1801
- Died: 12 June 1878 (aged 76)
- Party: Conservative

William McCormick (1801 – 12 June 1878) was an Irish Conservative Party politician.

McCormick was elected as Member of Parliament (MP) for Londonderry City at a by-election in 1860 but stood down at the next general election in 1865.

Parliament of the United Kingdom
Preceded by Robert Ferguson	Member of Parliament for Londonderry City; 1860 – 1865	Succeeded by Richard Dowse
