= 1946 Londonderry Borough Council election =

Local govt election in Northern Ireland

	Majority party	Minority party	Third party
Leader	Sir Basil McFarland		Patrick Fox
Party	UUP	Nationalist	Derry Labour Party
Seats won	12	4	4
- Results by ward.
Mayor before election
Basil McFarland
UUP
Elected mayor
Basil McFarland
UUP

Elections to Londonderry Borough Council were held on 16 October 1946. The Ulster Unionist Party (UUP) retained their majority with Sir Basil McFarland continuing as Mayor of Londonderry. The elections were postponed from the original February date due to an unusually large number of objections to the list of electors.

== Background ==
The election was held following the passage of the 1946 Elections and Franchise Act (Northern Ireland) by the Parliament of Northern Ireland which limited the voting franchise to only ratepayers and their wives and granted business owners the rights to cast up to six business votes (depending on the size of their business.) The boundaries for the election had also been reviewed by the Londonderry Corporation and drawn by the Parliament of Northern Ireland.

== Campaigns ==
Controversy arose during the calling of the election. On 20 January 1946, the Londonderry Corporation called the election to be held on 10 February and only gave candidates 11 days to file for candidacy. No reason was given for this by Sir Basil though it was speculated in the United States House of Representatives by the Montana 1st representative Mike Mansfield that it was only called so that the old electoral register with its unionist majority would be used rather than a new one that was due to come into effect six weeks later. This would have had the effect of disenfranchising younger nationalist voters which would have given nationalists a majority.

Éamon de Valera, the Taoiseach of the Irish Free State, held a meeting at Mansion House, Dublin with nationalist party leaders from Northern Ireland as well as Irish Free State parties. Collectively, they released a statement condemning the move calling it "electoral manipulation" and encouraged nationalists in the Londonderry Borough Council area to legally object. Owing to the controversies and challenges to the electors' eligibility, the election was delayed until 16 October. During pre-election hustings, William Henry McLaughlin, who was standing for election for the UUP in Waterside, declared that he had only ever employed one Roman Catholic in forty-eight years and that was only due to a case of mistaken identity.

Four parties ultimately contested the election:

- the Ulster Unionist Party
- Nationalist candidates running on an Anti-Partition platform
- the 'Derry Labour Party' - a local independent anti-partition left-wing party led by Patrick "Paddy" Fox, separate from the Northern Ireland Labour Party
- the 'Londonderry Labour Party' - a local affiliate of the Northern Ireland Labour Party

== Council results ==
The election was won by the UUP with a majority of 12 seats. The Nationalist Party and the Derry Labour Party won 4 seats each. The UUP won 3 aldermen with the Nationalists and Derry Labour Party winning 1 each. In the North Ward, the UUP won all 6 available seats while in the South Ward, the Nationalists and Derry Labour Party won 3 seats each. In Waterside, 3 UUP members were returned in an uncontested election for the ward.

== Results by ward ==
Elections were held in every ward for both alderman and councillors. No aldermen elections were contested, resulting in all candidates being returned:

- UUP candidates Captain Thomas Fitzpatrick Cooke and Samuel Wallace Kennedy OBE were returned from North Ward
- Derry Labour Party candidate Patrick Fox and Nationalist Party candidate Francis Edward McCarroll were returned from South Ward
- UUP candidate William James Little was returned from Waterside Ward

=== North Ward ===
North Ward 6 Councillors Electorate: 5,622
Party	Candidate	Votes	%	±%
UUP	James C. Hamilton	3,203	71.21	
UUP	Gerald Stanley Glover	3,200	71.14	
UUP	S. Dowds	3,195	71.03	
UUP	J. J. Hill	3,188	70.88	
UUP	Sir Basil McFarland	3,180	70.70	
UUP	A. McGowan	3,148	69.99	
NI Labour	A. H. Halliday	1,247	27.72	
NI Labour	J. Campbell	1,220	27.12	
NI Labour	F. Moorehead	1,159	25.77	
NI Labour	M. T. Mulhearn	1,132	25.17	
Turnout		4,498	80.01	

=== South Ward ===
South Ward 6 Councillors Electorate: 7,468
Party	Candidate	Votes	%	±%
Derry Labour Party	W. Barr	3,751	73.23	
Nationalist / Anti-Partition	T. Doherty	3,730	72.82	
Derry Labour Party	James Deeney	3,727	72.76	
Nationalist / Anti-Partition	Daniel Barr	3,727	72.76	
Nationalist / Anti-Partition	Patrick J. Downey	3,675	71.75	
Derry Labour Party	W. Mullan	3,538	69.07	
NI Labour	Stephen McGonagle	1,236	24.13	
NI Labour	G. Hamill	1,233	24.08	
NI Labour	J. Sharkey	1,099	21.46	
NI Labour	W. McLeery	1,093	21.34	
Turnout		5,122	68.59	

=== Waterside Ward ===
Only the UUP put up candidates in Waterside ward, resulting in all three being elected unopposed:

- Robert Graham
- William Henry MacLoughlin
- Samuel Orr

== Notes ==
1. Voters in North and South wards could each vote for up to 6 candidates. As a result vote totals do not equal turnout.
