= Senator Leslie =

Senator Leslie may refer to:

- James Graham Leslie (1868–1949), Northern Irish Senate
- Preston Leslie (1819–1907), Kentucky State Senate
- Sheila Leslie (born 1955), Nevada State Senate
- Tim Leslie (born 1942), California State Senate

== See also ==
- John T. Lesley (1835–1913), Florida State Senate
