= Route Tenants' Defence Association =

The Route Tenants' Defence Association (R.T.D.A.), originally called the Route Tenant-Right Association, was founded in Ballymoney in 1869. It campaigned for the rights of tenant farmers in the area of County Antrim known as The Route.

Key members of the group included Thomas McElderry, chairman of the Ballymoney town commissioners and lessee of the markets in the town, and Samuel C. McElroy, editor of the Ballymoney Free Press and an auctioneer.

The R.T.D.A. was hostile to the Land League, believing the latter's objectives were too extreme.
