= Sir Charles Lewis, 1st Baronet =

British politician

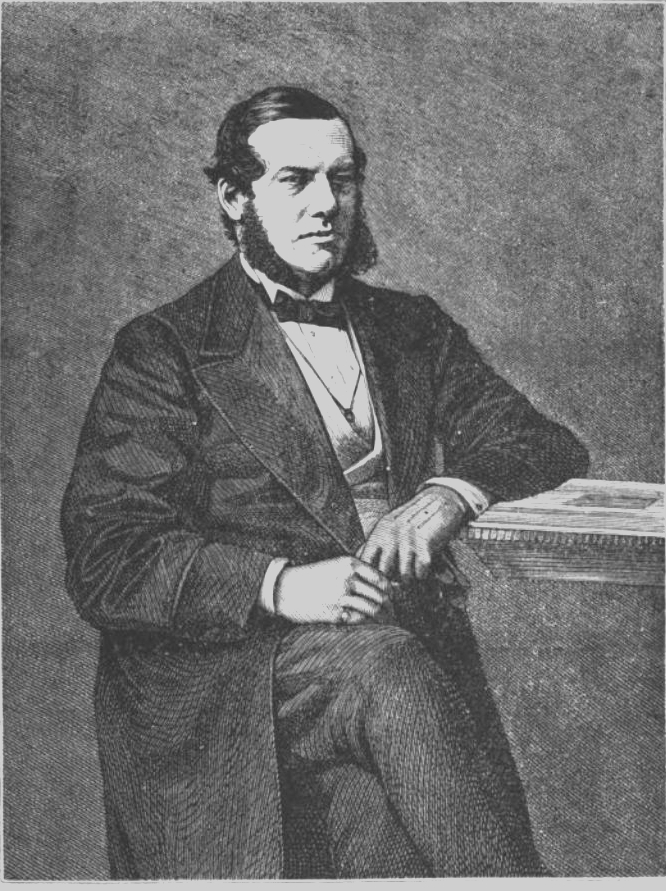
Charles Edward Lewis, 1876 engraving

Escutcheon of the Lewis baronets of Brighton

Sir Charles Edward Lewis, 1st Baronet (25 December 1825 – 10 February 1893) was an English lawyer and Conservative politician who sat in the House of Commons in two periods between 1872 and 1892.

== Background and early life ==
He was born at Wakefield, the third son of Rev. George William Lewis and his wife Caroline Concanen, daughter of Mathew Concanen (or Matthew Concanon) of Southwark. He attended St Saviour's Grammar School in Southwark.

Lewis's father (1795/6–1858), son of David Baxter Lewis, solicitor, of Rochester, Kent, was admitted to Lincoln's Inn in 1819. He was ordained deacon in 1821, by George Henry Law, as a literatus and appointed a curate to Handsworth in the West Riding of Yorkshire. He was ordained priest in 1822, by Edward Venables-Vernon-Harcourt, the Archbishop of York. In 1824 he was moved within the West Riding to Stanley. He was a ten-year man at Christ's College, Cambridge and a graduate of Magdalen Hall, Oxford, where he had matriculated in 1829, aged 33. He later was curate of the chapel of ease at Ramsgate, publishing a book of sermons in 1836, and from 1839 to 1848 was vicar of St Peter's Church, Southwark. He was appointed a Reader at Christ Church Greyfriars, and in 1849 became Vicar of Crich.

== London solicitor ==
Lewis was admitted a solicitor in 1847.

In the aftermath of the 1852 general election, where the Marquess of Blandford was defeated at Middlesex, Lewis proposed a Conservative Franchise Society. It had been noticed that the voting, in a close contest, had been concentrated in Bethnal Green in a way that had pushed the Marquess into third place, in the two-member constituency; and that the National Land Company had been active in voter registration in that area. Lewis's suggestion presaged a similar idea, from John George Henry Pownall who had been on Blandford's election committee, and Charles Lewis Gruneisen. When the Conservative Land Society, a building society, was set up, Gruneisen became its company secretary, and Harrison & Lewis, Lewis's firm, became solicitors to the Society.

At this point Harrison & Lewis were at New Boswell Court, Carey Street. Later the site was affected by the construction of the Royal Courts of Justice, and the firm moved to Old Jewry. In 1873 Lewis was head of the firm there, trading as Lewis, Munns & Longden.

Lewis retired from legal work in 1876.

== In politics ==
In 1872 Lewis was elected member of parliament for Londonderry. He held the seat until 1886. After the 1886 general election, he was unseated on petition. He was created baronet of Brighton in the County of Sussex on 6 April 1887. Also in 1887 he was elected MP for Antrim North and held the seat until 1892.

In 1875 Lewis told in evidence a parliamentary select committee of which he was a member "I have always taken the greatest possible interest in elections and in electoral law."

== Death ==
Lewis died in 1893 at the age of 67; the baronetcy then became extinct, since he left no heir. He had for 32 years been an Elder of the St John's Wood English Presbyterian Church. The Church had paid a rentcharge to Lewis for its land in St John's Wood since 1871, an arrangement brought to a close in 1893 by his wife Lady Lewis and his brother Francis Theodore Lewis, his executors, and others.

== Works ==
- The Election Manual for England and Wales (1857)
- Two Lectures on a Short Visit to America (1876)

== Family ==
Lewis married Isabella Ellison, daughter of Richard Annesley Ellison, merchant of Bristol, in 1850. The couple had male twins, who died young. Dame Isabella Lewis died on 4 June 1900 at 20 Connaught Square, London, aged 81.

=== William David Lewis ===
Lewis's eldest brother was the barrister and legal writer William David Lewis QC (1823–1861) of Lincoln's Inn, who took silk in 1859. He was an unsuccessful Conservative candidate at Pontefract in 1852 (petitioned),, at Marlborough in 1857 (petitioned), at Sandwich in 1859, and at Norwich in 1860 on a strongly Protestant platform.

William David Lewis published in 1843 A Practical Treatise on the Law of Perpetuity. His only son William Arnold Lewis FLS (died 1877) was a special pleader of the Inner Temple, known as an entomologist. He was killed in a climbing accident on the Lyskamm. His daughter Fanny Mabel married in 1902 the anaesthetist Zebulon Mennell.

=== Other brothers ===
The second brother George Henry Lewis was called to the bar, and died of heart disease in 1848 aged 24. His younger brother Francis Theodore Lewis (1827–1909), a surveyor and auctioneer, married in 1862 Sylvia St Mary Ball, elder sister of Rosamund Marriott Watson.

Parliament of the United Kingdom
Preceded by Richard Dowse	Member of Parliament for Londonderry City; 1872 – 1886	Succeeded by Justin McCarthy
Preceded by Edward Macnaghten	Member of Parliament for North Antrim; 1887 – 1892	Succeeded by Charles Cunningham Connor
Baronetage of the United Kingdom
New creation	Baronet (of Brighton); 1887–1893	Extinct
Preceded by Clark baronets	Lewis baronets of Brighton; 6 April 1887	Succeeded by Hanson baronets
