= Sir George Hill, 2nd Baronet =

Irish politician

Sir George FitzGerald Hill, 2nd Baronet (1 June 1763 – 8 March 1839) was an Irish politician and British colonial administrator.

== Family and early life ==
He was the oldest son of Sir Hugh Hill, 1st Baronet of Brook Hall, County Londonderry, who had been a member of the Parliament of Ireland for Londonderry City from 1768 to 1795. His mother Hannah was a daughter of John McClintock,

Hill was educated in Londonderry and at Trinity College, Dublin. He then studied at Lincoln's Inn and was called to the bar in Ireland in 1786. In 1788, he married Jane Beresford, daughter of Hon. John Beresford (son of the Marcus Beresford, 1st Earl of Tyrone), who was President of the Irish Board of Revenue).

== Career ==
Hill was a member of the Orange Order, serving for time on the committee of the Grand Lodge of Ireland.

He was a member of the Parliament of Ireland for Coleraine from 1791 to 1795, and then succeeded his father as MP for Londonderry City 1798. He was Clerk of the Irish House of Commons.

In the Parliament of the United Kingdom, he was the Member of Parliament (MP) for County Londonderry from 1801 to 1802, and for Londonderry City from 1802 to 1830.

He was appointed a Lord of the Irish Treasury in 1806 and became a member of the Privy Council of Ireland in 1808. In 1817 he was appointed Vice-Treasurer for Ireland and became a member of the Privy Council of the United Kingdom.

From 1800 he was Lieutenant-Colonel of the Londonderry Militia (under Lord Castlereagh as Colonel) and succeeded to the colonelcy after Castelreagh's suicide in 1822.

Hill was Governor of Saint Vincent from 1830 to 1833, and then Governor of Trinidad from 1833 until his death in 1839. The St. Joseph Mutiny occurred in 1837 during his tenure as governor, which spanned the emancipation of the British West Indies.

Parliament of Ireland
Preceded by George Jackson; John Beresford	Member of Parliament for Coleraine; 1791 – 1795; With: George Jackson	Succeeded by George Jackson; William Monck
Preceded by William Lecky; Hugh Hill	Member of Parliament for Londonderry City; 1795 – 1798; With: William Lecky to January 1798; Henry Alexander from January 1798	Succeeded by Henry Alexander; Andrew Ferguson
Parliament of the United Kingdom
Preceded by Hon. Charles William Stewart; 2nd seat vacant	Member of Parliament for County Londonderry; 1801 – 1802; With: Hon. Charles William Stewart	Succeeded by Hon. Charles William Stewart; Lord George Thomas Beresford
Preceded by Henry Alexander	Member of Parliament for Londonderry City; 1802 – 1830	Succeeded by Sir Robert Ferguson, Bt
Government offices
Preceded by William John Struth (acting)	Governor of Saint Vincent; 1831 – 1833	Succeeded by George Tyler as Lieutenant Governor
Preceded by Lewis Grant	Governor of Trinidad; 1833 – 1839	Succeeded by John Alexander Mein (acting)
Baronetage of Ireland
Preceded by Hugh Hill	Baronet (of Brook Hall); 1795 – 1839	Succeeded by George Hill
