= Clark baronets of Melville Crescent, Edinburgh (1886) =

Escutcheon of the Clark baronets of Melville Crescent

The Clark baronetcy, of Melville Crescent, Edinburgh in the County of Midlothian, was created in the Baronetage of the United Kingdom on 28 September 1886 for Thomas Clark, Lord Provost of Edinburgh between 1885 and 1888.

== Clark baronets, of Melville Crescent, Edinburgh (1886) ==
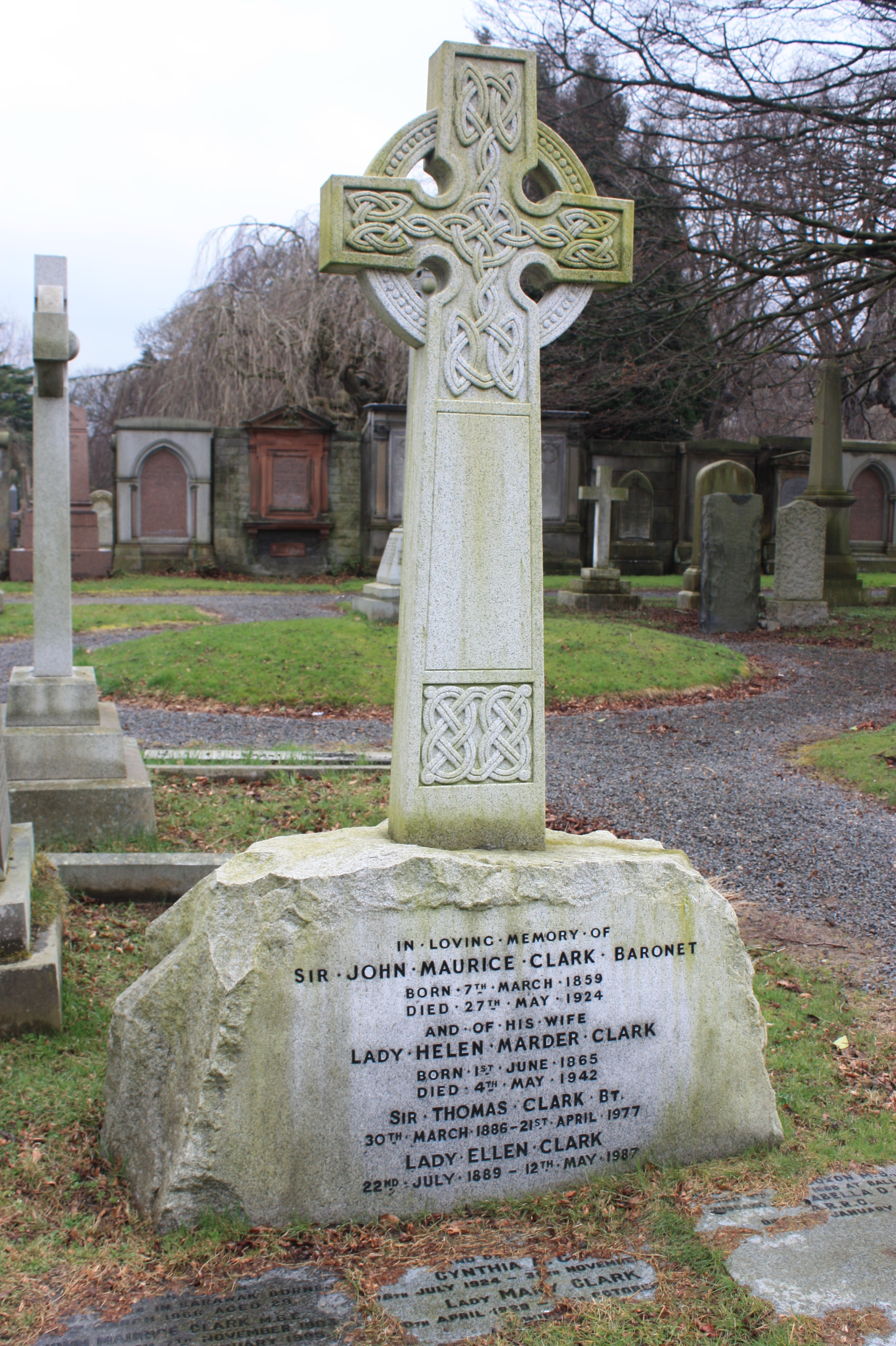
The grave of the Edinburgh Clark baronets, Dean Cemetery

- Sir Thomas Clark, 1st Baronet FRSE (1823–1900)
- Sir John Maurice Clark, 2nd Baronet (1859–1924)
- Sir Thomas Clark, 3rd Baronet FRSE (1886–1977)
- Sir John Douglas Clark, 4th Baronet (1923–1991)
- Sir Francis Drake Clark, 5th Baronet (1924–2019)
- Sir Edward Drake Clark, 6th Baronet (born 1966)

The heir presumptive is Timothy Ian Hugh Clark (born 1966), a great-grandson of the 2nd Baronet.

== Extended family ==
Henry James Douglas Clark MC (1888–1978), second son of the 2nd Baronet, was a Brigadier in the 1st Battalion of the Argyll and Sutherland Highlanders.

== Notes ==
Baronetage of the United Kingdom
| Preceded by Jones-Parry baronets | Clark baronets of Melville Crescent; 28 September 1886 | Succeeded by Lewis baronets |
