= 1860 Londonderry City by-election =

UK parliamentary by-election

The 1860 Londonderry City by-election was held on 2 April following the 13 March 1860 death of the incumbent, the Liberal Party's Sir Robert Ferguson. Ferguson had held the seat since 1830 and had received significant support from the Catholic segment of the constituency. The Liberal Party's candidate Samuel MacCurdy Greer had counted on this support transferring to him, however the Irish Conservative Party's candidate William McCormick, who employed a significant number of Catholic workers, managed to split the Catholic vote. The Liberal Party's Presbyterian support had also been adversely affected by their defeat to the Tories in Londonderry County in 1857, which led many to withdraw from politics.

The election resulted in a narrow victory for McCormick, with a 19-vote majority. He held the seat until his retirement at the 1865 United Kingdom general election.

== Background ==
Londonderry City, a one-seat borough constituency, had been represented in the House of Commons of the British Parliament by Sir Robert Ferguson, 2nd Baronet since the 1830 United Kingdom general election. Ferguson, who represented first the Whig and then the Liberal Party, died on 13 March 1860, triggering a by-election. Ferguson had been unopposed in all five elections held in the constituency since 1841.

== Candidates ==
The Irish Conservative Party's candidate was William McCormick, a Donegal-born engineering contractor. He arrived in Londonderry in 1840 as an entrepreneur during a land reclamation project on Lough Swilly. McCormick was popular as he had intervened to save local railway lines running to Coleraine and Enniskillen and employed hundreds of local people. There were two Liberal Party candidates Samuel MacCurdy Greer and George Skipton. Greer was born in County Londonderry and represented the county constituency as a Radical between the 1857 and 1859 general elections. Skipton was a resident of Beech Hill in Londonderry. All of the candidates were prominent in the municipal life of Londonderry.

== Result ==
The electorate comprised freemen of the city, houseowners with property rated at a value in excess of £10 per year and occupiers of properties rated at £8 or more per year.

Ferguson had been largely apolitical and had received the support of the Catholic population. However the majority of constituents were Protestants (around 37% Presbyterians and 22% Episcopalians) and, with a weakening of Liberal support in the city following Ferguson's death, from 1860 the Conservative Party entered a period of dominance. The Presbyterians had supported Greer at the 1857 by-election for Londonderry County but the victory of Tory landlord-nominee James Johnston Clark led to the withdrawal of many Presbyterians from politics. McCormick, many of whose employees were Catholic, campaigned heavily for support from this segment of the population. This was successful in splintering the Catholic vote, which Greer had thought he could count on. Skipton had hoped to attract support from across all groups in the city, but because of strong denominational ties in the constituency only received a handful of votes.

McCormick won the election, held on 2 April, with 327 votes compared to 309 for Greer and 82 for Skipton. An election petition was made against the result but the House of Commons committee declared the result as valid on 8 June 1860. McCormick chose to serve only one term, retiring on 11 July 1865 with the dissolution of parliament ahead of the 1865 United Kingdom general election.

By-election, 2 April 1860: Londonderry City
Party	Candidate	Votes	%	±%
Irish Conservative	William McCormick	326	45.6	New
Liberal	Samuel MacCurdy Greer	307	42.9	N/A
Liberal	George Skipton	82	11.5	N/A
Majority		19	2.7	N/A
Turnout		715	86.7	N/A
Registered electors		825		
Conservative gain from Liberal		Swing	N/A	
