= Coleraine Chronicle =

Northern Irish newspaper

- Owner(s): Alpha Media Group Ltd
- Founded: 1844
- Headquarters: 2 Lodge Road, Coleraine BT52 1NB
- Website: https://www.colerainechronicle.co.uk/

The Coleraine Chronicle is a newspaper in Northern Ireland. It was founded in 1844. In 1934, it incorporated the Ballymoney Free Press.
