= Minister for Industries =

Former Irish government cabinet minister

The minister for industries was a position in the Ministry of Dáil Éireann, the government of the Irish Republic, the self-declared state which was established in 1919 by Dáil Éireann, the parliamentary assembly made up of the majority of Irish MPs elected in the 1918 general election. The portfolio was created to promote industrial development throughout the country. The post existed only during a single ministry.

From 1922, there was a position of Minister for Industry and Commerce, which is now named the Minister for Enterprise, Tourism and Employment.

== Minister for Industries ==
Name	Term of office		Political party	Dáil Ministry
Eoin MacNeill	1 April 1919	26 August 1921	Sinn Féin	2nd DM
