= David Cairnes =

Irish lawyer and MP involved in the Siege of Derry

David Cairnes (1645–1722) was an Irish lawyer and Member of Parliament who was actively involved in the Siege of Derry.

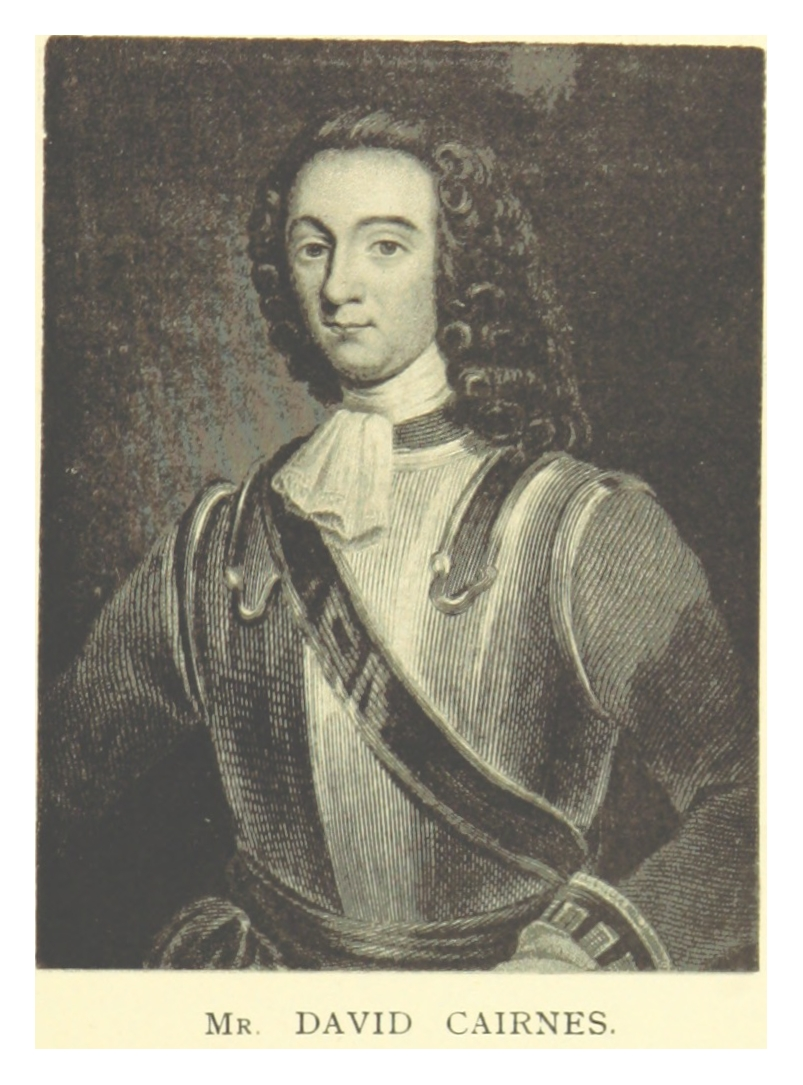

A man of property and influence in Londonderry, he argued for the town to be defended when forces loyal to the Catholic James II of England advanced against it in December 1688. Later in the month Cairnes left for London to plead for military and financial assistance from William of Orange and the Irish Society, returning in April 1689. He was then appointed Lieutenant-Colonel of a regiment to help defend the besieged town, which survived the siege until it was finally lifted in August 1639.

After the war was over Cairnes was elected in 1692 to represent the borough in the Irish House of Commons, sitting until 1699. He was appointed Recorder of Londonderry in 1707, succeeding Robert Rochfort.

He died in 1722 and was buried in the cathedral churchyard. He had married Margaret Edwards of Straw and had a son and two daughters. His son, Captain John Cairnes, predeceased him in Newcastle upon Tyne.
