= Francis Andrews =

Irish politician, and college leader and donor

The Right Honourable Francis Andrews

20th Provost of Trinity College Dublin
- In office 1 November 1758 – 18 June 1774
- Preceded by: Richard Baldwin
- Succeeded by: John Hely-Hutchinson

Member of Parliament for Londonderry City
- In office 1 May 1761 – 18 June 1774
- Preceded by: William Hamilton
- Succeeded by: James Alexander

Member of Parliament for Midelton
- In office 11 June 1759 – 1 May 1761
- Preceded by: William Annesley
- Succeeded by: Thomas Brodrick

Personal details
- Born: 6 August 1718 Derry, Ireland
- Died: 18 June 1774 (aged 55) Westminster, London, England
- Education: Trinity College Dublin

Francis Andrews (6 August 1718 – 18 June 1774) was an Anglo-Irish politician and academic who served as the 20th Provost of Trinity College Dublin from 1758 to 1774. He was also a member of the Irish House of Commons from 1759 to 1774.

== Biography ==
Andrews was born in Derry in 1718, the son and heir of Alexander Andrews of County Antrim. He was educated at Trinity College Dublin, which he entered in 1733, and he became a Fellow of the university in 1740.

In 1758, he was appointed Provost of Trinity College Dublin, and in 1759 was elected to the Irish House of Commons for Midleton. From 1761, until his death, he sat for the City of Londonderry. He was appointed to the Irish Privy Council on 6 April 1761.

In 1766–7 he travelled extensively in Italy, meeting academics from the University of Padua and sitting for a portrait by Anton von Maron. He brought back a large collection of paintings, scultupres and busts, many of which were subsequently donated to Trinity College and form part of the collection at the Provost's House, Trinity College Dublin, which Andrews had built in 1759.

On his death in London in 1774 he left £3,000 to found the Andrews chair of astronomy at Trinity College and the Dunsink Observatory.

Academic offices
Preceded by Richard Baldwin	Provost of Trinity College Dublin; 1758–1774	Succeeded by John Hely-Hutchinson
