= James Graham Leslie =

Unionist politician in Northern Ireland; High Sheriff

James Graham Leslie (14 November 1868 – 16 May 1949) was a unionist politician in Northern Ireland.

He was born the son of Seymour and Louisa (née Graham) Leslie. His father worked in the Probate Office, London. He inherited the family seat at Leslie Hill, Ballymoney, County Antrim from his uncle. He was appointed High Sheriff of Antrim in 1907.

Leslie studied at Gray's Inn and briefly went into the law, before joining the Contract Department of the British Foreign Office. In 1907, he served as High Sheriff of Antrim. He resigned when given control of his family estates, and sat as an Irish Unionist Party councillor in County Antrim. In 1921, he was elected for the Ulster Unionist Party to the first Senate of Northern Ireland, and served until his death in 1949. Given his experience in drafting, he played a key role in maintaining the chamber as an institution capable of revising bills from the lower chamber.

From 1945 to 1949, Leslie served as the Lord Lieutenant of Antrim.

He married in 1901 Grace, the daughter of J. Lament Brodie of Wimbledon, with whom he had a son, Seymour, and two daughters.

Honorary titles
| Preceded by Hercules Arthur Pakenham | High Sheriff of Antrim; 1907 | Succeeded by William Ellison-Macartney |
| Preceded by Shane O'Neill | Lord Lieutenant of Antrim; 1945–1949 | Succeeded by Hugh O'Neill |
