= Basil McFarland =

Soldier, businessperson, and politician

Sir Basil Alexander Talbot McFarland, 2nd Baronet, CBE, ERD (18 February 1898 – 5 March 1986) was a Northern Irish soldier, businessman and Ulster Unionist Party politician.

The son of Sir John McFarland, 1st Baronet, he was a businessman, a Senator of Northern Ireland, Mayor of Derry (1939–1940 and 1945–1950), Lord Lieutenant of the County Borough of Londonderry (1939–1975) and an Ireland rugby union international (1920–1922). He succeeded to his father's title in 1926.

Born in Derry, McFarland was educated at Bedford School and also in Brussels and Neuwied-on-Rhine, Germany.

== Public service ==
McFarland was High Sheriff of Londonderry City, 1930–1938 and 1952, High Sheriff of County Londonderry, 1952. He served in 1918 with the Artists Rifles, and in the Second World War served overseas, in North Africa, Sudan, Palestine and Italy with 9th Londonderry HAA Regiment RA (SR) and was Mentioned in Despatches when his battery (25 HAA Battery) was redeployed as infantry in the Salerno beachhead in September 1943.

He was Commanding Officer of the Londonderry City Battalion of the Home Guard, 1952–1956, Chairman of the Territorial Army and Auxiliary Force Association (Co. Londonderry), 1947–1962, and a member of its national Council. McFarland was Hon. Colonel of 9th Londonderry HAA Regiment of the Royal Artillery (SR), Hon. Colonel of 246th (Derry) (M) HAA Regiment RA (TA)and President of the Northern Ireland TA and Volunteer Reserve Association, 1968–1971.

He was a Commissioner of Irish Lights, an original member of the Northern Ireland Unemployment Assistance Board (to 1939), a Senator in the Parliament of Northern Ireland as Mayor of Derry, 1939-1940 and 1945–1950, a member of the Northern Ireland Air Advisory Council, 1946–1965, Chairman of Londonderry Port and Harbour Commissioners, 1952–1967, a member of the London Midland Area Board of the British Transport Commission, 1955–1961, and a trustee of Magee University College, Derry, 1962–1965.

== Businesses ==
His directorships and business interests included directorships of the Belfast Banking Company Ltd, 1930–1970, the Belfast Bank Executor & Trustee Company, and the Donegal Railway Company, a local directorship of the Commercial Union Assurance Co., and the chairmanship of Sir Alfred McAlpine & Son (Northern Ireland) Ltd, the Londonderry and Lough Swilly Railway Company, Lanes (Derry) Ltd, Lanes (Fuel Oils) Ltd, Lanes (Business Equipment) Ltd, John W. Corbett & Sons, R.C. Malseed & Co. Ltd, Alexander Thompson & Co. Ltd and the Londonderry Gaslight Co.

== Personal life ==
McFarland was married to Annie Kathleen Henderson (d. 1952), daughter of Andrew Henderson JP of Parkville, Whiteabbey, Belfast. McFarland had two children, including Sir John McFarland, 3rd Baronet, who lives at Dunmore House in Carrigans in the east of County Donegal. His second marriage took place in 1955 to Mary Eleanor Dougan. He lived at Aberfoyle House, a small mansion that overlooks the Strand Road in the City of Derry (now part of the 'Magee Campus' of the University of Ulster).

He was Given the Freedom of the City of Derry in 1944.

== Sources ==
proni.gov.uk

Civic offices
Preceded by James McElmunn Wilton	Mayor of Derry; 1939–40	Succeeded by Frederick Simmons
Preceded by Frederick Simmons	Mayor of Derry; 1945–50	Succeeded by Gerald Stanley Glover
Honorary titles
Preceded by William Moore	Lord Lieutenant of the City of Londonderry; 1939–1975	Succeeded by Thomas Fitzpatrick Cooke
Baronetage of the United Kingdom
Preceded by John McFarland	Baronet (of Aberfoyle); 1926–1986	Succeeded by John McFarland
