= Sir Robert Ferguson, 2nd Baronet =

Sir Robert Alexander Ferguson, 2nd Baronet (26 December 1795 –13 March 1860) was a Whig and then Liberal Party politician from Ireland.

Ferguson was born in Derry in 1796 as son of Sir Andrew Ferguson (1761–1808), a banker and mayor of Derry from 1796 to 1798, and Elizabeth, daughter of the Derry merchant Robert Alexander of Broom Hall, who was the brother of James Alexander, 1st Earl of Caledon. Ferguson succeeded to the baronetcy in July 1808, after his father was killed in accident on a bridge in Moville, County Donegal. Ferguson was educated at Trinity College, Cambridge, where he graduated MA in 1817. He was Colonel of the disembodied Londonderry Militia from 1839 (and Honorary Colonel from 1855 when it was embodied for the Crimean War) and Lord Lieutenant of County Londonderry from 1840 to 1860. He lived at The Farm, County Londonderry.

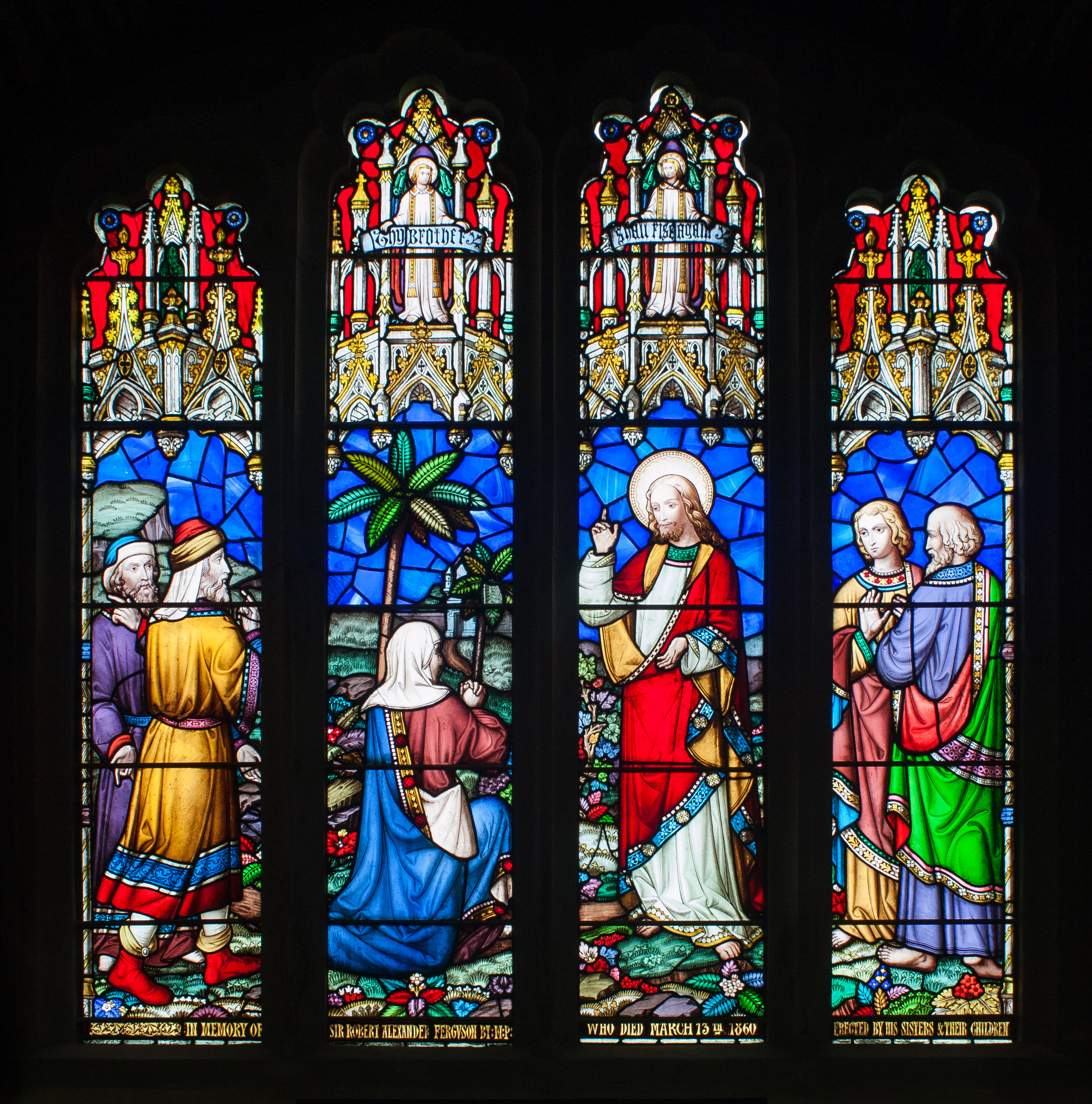
Stained glass window in memory of Sir Robert Ferguson, installed in the south aisle of St Columb's Cathedral c. 1860

He was appointed High Sheriff of Donegal in 1818 and High Sheriff of Tyrone in 1825 and then elected as the Member of Parliament (MP) for Londonderry City at the 1830 general election, but his election was declared void. A member of the United University club, he was re-elected at the resulting by-election held on 2 April 1831, and held the seat until his death in 1860, at the age of 63, when the baronetcy became extinct. In 1859 he voted in favour of the Derby ministry's reform bill.

There is a statue of Ferguson in Brooke Park in his native Derry.

Parliament of the United Kingdom
Preceded by Sir George Fitzgerald Hill, Bt	Member of Parliament for Londonderry City; 1830 – 1860	Succeeded by William McCormick
Honorary titles
Preceded by Lord Canning	Lord Lieutenant of County Londonderry; 1840–1860	Succeeded by Acheson Lyle
Baronetage of the United Kingdom
Preceded by Andrew Ferguson	Baronet (of The Farm, Londonderry); 1808–1860	Extinct
