= James Dougherty (civil servant) =

Irish politician (1844–1934)

Sir James Brown Dougherty, KCB, KCVO, PC (Ire) (13 November 1844 – 3 January 1934) was an Irish clergyman, academic, civil servant and politician.

Dougherty was born in Garvagh, County Londonderry, Ireland, to Archibald Dougherty, MRCS, a surgeon, and Martha Dougherty (née Brown) of Garvagh. He was educated at Queen's College, Belfast, and at Queen's University, Belfast (B.A. 1864 & M.A., 1865).

In 1880, he married Mary (née Donaldson) (d.1887), of The Park, Nottingham, with whom he had a son, John Gerald Dougherty (born 1883). In 1888, he married Elizabeth (née Todd), of Oaklands, Rathgar, County Dublin.

Ordained a Presbyterian minister, he was Professor of Logic and English at then-Presbyterian Magee College, Londonderry from 1879 to 1895. He served as Assistant Commissioner on the Educational Endowments Commission of Ireland (1885–92) and was Commissioner of Education from 1890 to 1895. He became Professor of Logic and English at Magee College in Londonderry in 1879, holding the post until 1895. In 1895, he was appointed Assistant Under-Secretary to the Lord-Lieutenant of Ireland (Lord Houghton) and became Under-Secretary for Ireland in 1908. He was appointed Clerk to H.M.'s Privy Council, and Deputy Keeper of the Privy Seal in 1895. He became a Liberal MP for Londonderry City from 1914–18, succeeding fellow Liberal David Cleghorn Hogg. He was succeeded by Eoin MacNeill of Sinn Féin in the 1918 general election.

== Honours ==
Dougherty was appointed a Companion of the Order of the Bath (Civil Division) (CB) in the 1900 Birthday Honours list. He was made a Knight Bachelor in the 1902 Coronation Honours list, and was knighted by the Lord Lieutenant of Ireland, Earl Cadogan, at Dublin Castle on 11 August 1902. He was appointed a Commander of the Royal Victorian Order (CVO) in 1903; advanced to a Knight Commander of the Bath (Civil Division) (KCB) in 1910; and promoted to a Knight Commander of the Royal Victorian Order (KCVO) in 1911.

Academic offices
Preceded by Thomas Croskery as Professor of Logic, Belles Lettres and Rhetoric	Professor of Logic and English at Magee College, Derry, County Londonderry; 1879–95	Succeeded by George Woodburn
Parliament of the United Kingdom
Preceded by David Cleghorn Hogg	Member of Parliament for Londonderry City; 1914 – 1918	Succeeded by Eoin MacNeill
