= Ballymoney Free Press =

The Ballymoney Free Press was a newspaper published from 1863 until November 1, 1934, when it was incorporated with the Coleraine Chronicle. In its early years it was edited by Samuel C. McElroy, an auctioneer who was also a key member of the Route Tenants' Defence Association.
