= Eoin MacNeill =

Irish politician and scholar (1867–1945)

- MacNeill, c. 1900s

Minister for Education
- In office 30 August 1922 – 24 November 1925
- President: W. T. Cosgrave
- Preceded by: Fionán Lynch
- Succeeded by: John M. O'Sullivan

Ceann Comhairle of Dáil Éireann
- In office 16 August 1921 – 9 September 1922
- Deputy: John J. O'Kelly; Brian O'Higgins
- Preceded by: Seán T. O'Kelly
- Succeeded by: Michael Hayes

Minister for Industries
- In office 1 April 1919 – 26 August 1921
- President: Éamon de Valera
- Preceded by: New office
- Succeeded by: Office abolished

Minister for Finance
- In office 22 January 1919 – 1 April 1919
- President: Éamon de Valera
- Preceded by: New office
- Succeeded by: Michael Collins

Teachta Dála
- In office August 1923 – June 1927
- Constituency: Clare
- In office December 1918 – August 1923
- Constituency: National University

Member of Parliament for Londonderry City
- In office December 1918 – November 1922
- Preceded by: James Dougherty
- Succeeded by: Constituency abolished

Member of Parliament for National University
- In office December 1918 – November 1922
- Preceded by: New office
- Succeeded by: Constituency abolished

Member of the Northern Ireland Parliament for Londonderry
- In office 24 May 1921 – 3 April 1925
- Preceded by: New office
- Succeeded by: Basil McGuckin

Personal details
- Born: John McNeill; 15 May 1867 Glenarm, County Antrim, Ireland
- Died: 15 October 1945 (aged 78) Dublin, Ireland
- Party: Cumann na nGaedheal (1923–1933)
- Other political affiliations: Sinn Féin (1917–1923)
- Spouse: Agnes Moore (m. 1898)
- Children: 8
- Education: Queen's University Belfast

Eoin MacNeill (Irish: Eoin Mac Néill; born John McNeill; 15 May 1867 – 15 October 1945) was an Irish scholar, Irish language enthusiast, Gaelic revivalist, nationalist and politician who served as Minister for Education from 1922 to 1925, Ceann Comhairle of Dáil Éireann from 1921 to 1922, Minister for Industries 1919 to 1921 and Minister for Finance January 1919 to April 1919. He served as a Teachta Dála (TD) from 1918 to 1927. He was a Member of Parliament (MP) for Londonderry City from 1918 to 1922 and a Member of the Northern Ireland Parliament (MP) for Londonderry from 1921 to 1925.

A key figure of the Gaelic revival, MacNeill was a co-founder of the Gaelic League, to preserve the Irish language and culture. He has been described as "the father of the modern study of early Irish medieval history".

He established the Irish Volunteers in 1913 and served as Chief-of-Staff of the minority faction after it split in 1914 at the start of World War I. He held that position at the outbreak of the Easter Rising in 1916 but had no role in the Rising or its planning, which was carried out by his nominal subordinates, including Patrick Pearse, who were members of the secret society, the Irish Republican Brotherhood. On learning of the plans to launch an uprising on Easter Sunday, and after confronting Pearse about it, MacNeill issued a countermanding order, placing a last-minute newspaper advertisement instructing Volunteers not to participate.

In 1918 he was elected to the First Dáil as a member of Sinn Féin. MacNeill was the representative of the Irish Free State on the Irish Boundary Commission of 1924–1925 but was obliged to resign during a political crisis that arose when the recommendations of the commission became known. He also resigned his position of minister of education and lost his seat in the election of 1927.

== Early life ==
MacNeill was born John McNeill, one of five children born to Archibald McNeill, a Roman Catholic working-class baker, sailor and merchant, and his wife, Rosetta (née McAuley) McNeill, also a Catholic. He was raised in Glenarm, County Antrim, an area which "still retained some Irish-language traditions". His niece was nationalist and teacher, Máirín Beaumont.

MacNeill was educated at St Malachy's College (Belfast) and Queen's College, Belfast. He was interested in Irish history and immersed himself in its study. He achieved a BA degree in economics, jurisprudence and constitutional history in 1888, and then worked in the British Civil Service.

He co-founded the Gaelic League in 1893, along with Douglas Hyde; MacNeill was unpaid secretary from 1893 to 1897 and then became the initial editor of the League's official newspaper An Claidheamh Soluis (1899–1901). He was also editor of the Gaelic Journal from 1894 to 1899. In 1908, he was appointed professor of early Irish history at University College Dublin.

He married Agnes Moore on 19 April 1898. The couple had eight children, four sons and four daughters (though the 1911 census entry for Mac Neill noted 11 children, seven of whom were still alive).

== Irish Volunteers ==
The Gaelic League was from the start strictly non-political, but in 1915, a proposal was put forward to abandon that policy and become a semi-political organisation. MacNeill strongly supported that and rallied to his side a majority of delegates at the 1915 Oireachtas na Gaeilge. Douglas Hyde, a non-political Protestant, who had co-founded the League and been its president for 22 years, resigned immediately afterwards.

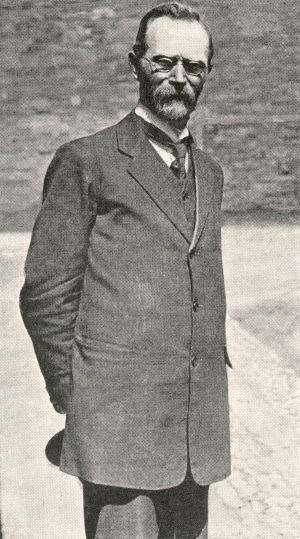
MacNeill circa 1916

Through the Gaelic League, MacNeill met members of Sinn Féin, the Irish Republican Brotherhood (IRB), and other nationalists and republicans. One such colleague, The O'Rahilly, ran the league's newspaper An Claidheamh Soluis, and in October 1913 they asked MacNeill to write an editorial for it on a subject broader than Irish language issues. MacNeill submitted a piece called "The North Began", encouraging the formation of a nationalist volunteer force committed to Irish Home Rule, much as the unionists had done earlier that year with the Ulster Volunteers to thwart Home Rule in Ireland. In July 1915 MacNeill commented on the threat that the unarmed nationalists in Ulster might face: "...a demented...English driven Orange Army would be let loose upon the helpless Catholic people of Ulster, who would be driven out of the province or massacred where they stood."

Bulmer Hobson, a member of the IRB, approached MacNeill about bringing the idea to fruition, and, through a series of meetings, MacNeill became chair of the council that formed the Irish Volunteers, later becoming its chief of staff. Unlike the IRB, MacNeill was opposed to the idea of an armed rebellion, except in resisting any suppression of the Volunteers, seeing little hope of success in open battle against the British army.

The Irish Volunteers had been infiltrated by the Irish Republican Brotherhood, which planned on using the organisation to stage an armed rebellion, to separate Ireland from the United Kingdom and establishing an Irish Republic. The entry of the UK into the First World War was, in their view, a perfect opportunity to do that. With the cooperation of James Connolly and the Irish Citizen Army, a secret council of IRB officials planned a general rising at Easter 1916. On the Wednesday before Easter, they presented MacNeill with a letter, allegedly stolen from high-ranking British staff in Dublin Castle, indicating that the British were going to arrest him and all the other nationalist leaders. Unbeknownst to MacNeill, the letter—called the Castle Document—was a forgery.

When MacNeill learned about the IRB's plans, and when he was informed that Roger Casement was about to land in County Kerry with a shipment of German arms, he was reluctantly persuaded to go along with them, believing British action was now imminent and that mobilization of the Irish Volunteers would be justified as a defensive act. However, after learning that the German arms shipment had been intercepted and Casement arrested, and having confronted Patrick Pearse, who refused to relent, MacNeill countermanded the order for the Rising by sending written messages to leaders around the country, and placing a notice in the Sunday Independent cancelling the planned "manoeuvres". That greatly reduced the number of volunteers who reported for duty on the day of the Easter Rising.

Pearse, Connolly and the others agreed that the uprising would go ahead anyway, but it began one day later than originally intended to ensure that the authorities were taken by surprise. Beginning on Easter Monday, 24 April 1916, the Rising lasted less than a week. After the surrender of the rebels, MacNeill was arrested although he had taken no part in the insurrection. The rebel leader Tom Clarke, according to his wife Kathleen, warned her on the day before his execution, "I want you to see to it that our people know of his treachery to us. He must never be allowed back into the National life of this country, for so sure as he is, so sure will he act treacherously in a crisis. He is a weak man, but I know every effort will be made to whitewash him."

== Political life ==
MacNeill was released from prison in 1917 and was elected MP for the National University and Londonderry City constituencies for Sinn Féin in the 1918 general election. In line with abstentionist Sinn Féin policy, he refused to take his seat in the British House of Commons in London and sat instead in the newly convened Dáil Éireann in Dublin, where he was made Secretary for Industries in the second ministry of the First Dáil. He was a member of the Parliament of Northern Ireland for Londonderry between 1921 and 1925, although he never took his seat. In 1921, he supported the Anglo-Irish Treaty. In 1922, he was in a minority of pro-Treaty delegates at the Irish Race Convention in Paris. Following the establishment of the Free State, he became Minister for Education in its second (provisional) government, the third Dáil. He strongly supported the execution of Richard Barrett, Liam Mellows, Joe McKelvey and Rory O'Connor during the Irish Civil War.

In 1923, MacNeill, a committed internationalist, was also a key member of the diplomatic team that oversaw Ireland's entry to the League of Nations.

MacNeill's family was split on the treaty issue. One son, Brian, took the anti-Treaty side and was killed in disputed circumstances near Sligo by Free State troops during the Irish Civil War in September 1922. Two other sons, Niall and Turloch, as well as nephew Hugo MacNeill, served as officers in the Free State Army. One of Eoin's brothers, James McNeill, was the second and penultimate Governor-General of the Irish Free State.

== Irish Boundary Commission ==
In 1924 the three-man Irish Boundary Commission was set up to settle the border between Northern Ireland and the Irish Free State; MacNeill represented the Irish Free State. MacNeill was the only member of the Commission without legal training and has been described as having been "pathetically out of his depth". However, each of the Commissioners was selected out of political expediency rather than for any established competence or insight into boundary making. On 7 November 1925, a conservative British newspaper, The Morning Post, published a leaked map showing a part of eastern County Donegal (mainly The Laggan district) that was to be transferred to Northern Ireland; the opposite of the main aims of the commission. Perhaps embarrassed by that, especially since he said that it had declined to respect the terms of the Treaty, MacNeill resigned from the commission on 20 November. MacNeill's performance in the Boundary Commission has been deemed highly negative in a 2025 study The Root of All Evil: The Irish Boundary Commission.

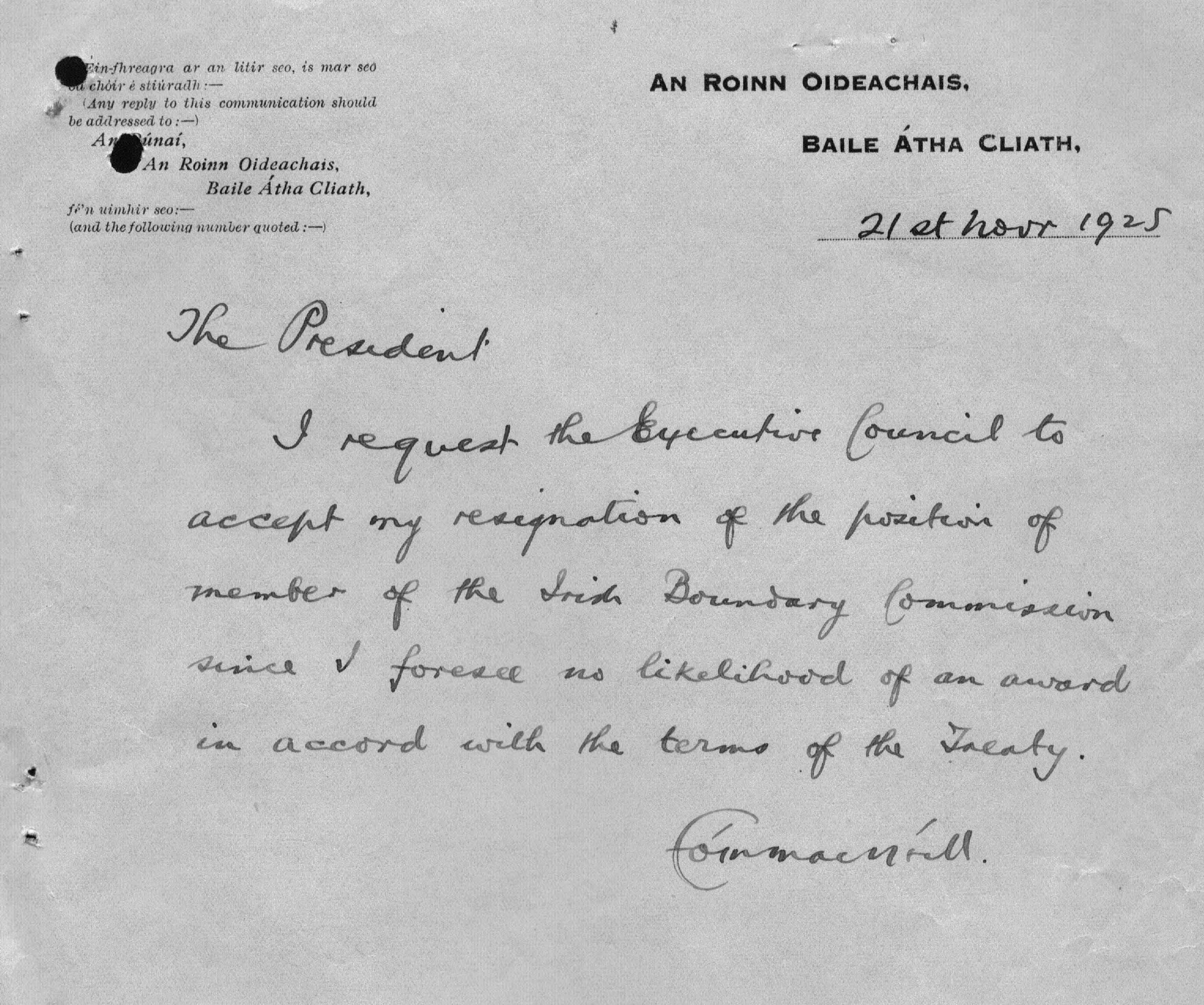
Mac Neill resignation note to the President of the Executive Council W. T. Cosgrave

On 24 November 1925 he also resigned as Minister for Education, a position unrelated to his work on the commission.

On 3 December 1925, the Free State government agreed with the governments in London and Belfast to end its onerous treaty requirement to pay its share of the United Kingdom's "imperial debt" and, in exchange, agreed that the 1920 boundary would remain as it was, overriding the commission. That angered many nationalists and MacNeill was the subject of much criticism, but in reality, he and the commission had been sidestepped by the intergovernmental debt renegotiation. In any case, despite his resignations, the intergovernmental boundary deal was approved by a Dáil vote of 71–20 on 10 December 1925, and MacNeill is listed as voting with the majority in favour. He lost his Dáil seat at the June 1927 election.

== Academic ==
MacNeill was an important scholar of Irish history and among the first to study Early Irish law, offering both his interpretations, which at times were coloured by his nationalism, and translations into English. He was also the first to uncover the nature of succession in Irish kingship, and his theories are the foundation for modern ideas on the subject.

He was a contributor to the Royal Irish Academy's Clare Island Survey, recording the Irish place names of the island. His disagreements and disputes with Goddard Henry Orpen, particularly over the latter's book Ireland under the Normans, generated controversy.

He was President of the Royal Society of Antiquaries of Ireland from 1937 to 1940 and President of the Royal Irish Academy from 1940 to 1943.

== Later life and death ==
He retired from politics completely and became Chair of the Irish Manuscripts Commission. In his later years he devoted his life to scholarship, he published several books on Irish history. MacNeill died in Dublin of natural causes, aged 78 in 1945. He is buried in Kilbarrack Cemetery.

== Legacy ==
His grandson Michael McDowell served as Tánaiste, Minister for Justice, Equality and Law Reform, TD and a Senator. Another grandson, Myles Tierney, served as a member of Dublin County Council, where he was Fine Gael whip on the council.

== Works ==
- Ireland Before Saint Patrick (1903)
- Duanaire Finn: The Book of the lays of Fionn (1908)
- Early Irish population groups: their nomenclature, classification and chronology (1911)
- The Authorship and Structure of the Annals of Tigernach (1913)
- Phases of Irish history (1919)
- The Irish law of dynastic succession (1919)
- The Case for an Irish Republic (1920)
- Celtic Ireland (1921)
- History of Ireland: Pre-Christian times to 1921 (1932)
- Saint Patrick, Apostle of Ireland (1934)
- Early Irish laws and institutions (1935)
- The Irish Nation and Irish Culture (1938)
- Military service in Medieval Ireland (1941)

Parliament of the United Kingdom
New constituency	Member of Parliament for National University; 1918–1922	Constituency abolished
Preceded by James Dougherty	Member of Parliament for Londonderry City; 1918–1922	Constituency abolished
Oireachtas
Preceded by Seán T. O'Kelly	Ceann Comhairle of Dáil Éireann; 1921–1922	Succeeded by Michael Hayes
Political offices
New office	Minister for Finance; 1919	Succeeded by Michael Collins
New office	Minister for Industries; 1919–1921	Office abolished
Preceded by Fionán Lynch (Provisional Government)	Minister for Education; 1922–1925	Succeeded by John M. O'Sullivan
Preceded by Michael Hayes (Second Dáil – Post Treaty)	Minister for Education; 1922–1925	Succeeded by John M. O'Sullivan

Dáil	Election	Deputy (Party)	Deputy (Party)	Deputy (Party)	Deputy (Party)
1st	1918	Eoin MacNeill (SF)	1 seat under 1918 Act		
2nd	1921	Eoin MacNeill (SF)	Ada English (SF)	Michael Hayes (SF)	William Stockley (SF)
3rd	1922	Eoin MacNeill (PT-SF)	William Magennis (Ind.)	Michael Hayes (Note: Michael Hayes served as Ceann Comhairle from 9 September 1922 to 29 January 1932.) (PT-SF)	William Stockley (AT-SF)
4th	1923	Eoin MacNeill (CnaG)	William Magennis (CnaG)	Michael Hayes (CnaG)	3 seats from 1923
4th	1923 by-election	Patrick McGilligan (CnaG)	William Magennis (CnaG)	Michael Hayes (CnaG)	3 seats from 1923
5th	1927 (Jun)	Patrick McGilligan (CnaG)	Arthur Clery (Ind.)	Michael Hayes (CnaG)	3 seats from 1923
6th	1927 (Sep)	Patrick McGilligan (CnaG)	Michael Tierney (CnaG)	Michael Hayes (CnaG)	3 seats from 1923
7th	1932	Patrick McGilligan (CnaG)	Conor Maguire (FF)	Michael Hayes (CnaG)	3 seats from 1923
8th	1933	Patrick McGilligan (CnaG)	Conor Maguire (FF)	Helena Concannon (FF)	3 seats from 1923
8th	1936	Patrick McGilligan (CnaG)	(Vacant)	Helena Concannon (FF)	3 seats from 1923

Dáil	Election	Deputy (Party)	Deputy (Party)	Deputy (Party)	Deputy (Party)	Deputy (Party)
2nd	1921	Éamon de Valera (SF)	Brian O'Higgins (SF)	Seán Liddy (SF)	Patrick Brennan (SF)	4 seats 1921–1923
3rd	1922	Éamon de Valera (AT-SF)	Brian O'Higgins (AT-SF)	Seán Liddy (PT-SF)	Patrick Brennan (PT-SF)	4 seats 1921–1923
4th	1923	Éamon de Valera (Rep)	Brian O'Higgins (Rep)	Conor Hogan (FP)	Patrick Hogan (Lab)	Eoin MacNeill (CnaG)
5th	1927 (Jun)	Éamon de Valera (FF)	Patrick Houlihan (FF)	Thomas Falvey (FP)	Patrick Hogan (Lab)	Patrick Kelly (CnaG)
6th	1927 (Sep)	Éamon de Valera (FF)	Patrick Houlihan (FF)	Martin Sexton (FF)	Patrick Hogan (Lab)	Patrick Kelly (CnaG)
7th	1932	Éamon de Valera (FF)	Seán O'Grady (FF)	Martin Sexton (FF)	Patrick Hogan (Lab)	Patrick Burke (CnaG)
8th	1933	Éamon de Valera (FF)	Seán O'Grady (FF)	Patrick Houlihan (FF)	Patrick Hogan (Lab)	Patrick Burke (CnaG)
9th	1937	Éamon de Valera (FF)	Seán O'Grady (FF)	Thomas Burke (FP)	Patrick Hogan (Lab)	Patrick Burke (FG)
10th	1938	Éamon de Valera (FF)	Seán O'Grady (FF)	Thomas Burke (FP)	Peter O'Loghlen (FF)	Patrick Burke (FG)
11th	1943	Éamon de Valera (FF)	Seán O'Grady (FF)	Thomas Burke (FP)	Patrick Hogan (Lab)	Patrick Burke (FG)
12th	1944	Éamon de Valera (FF)	Seán O'Grady (FF)	Thomas Burke (FP)	Peter O'Loghlen (FF)	Patrick Burke (FG)
12th	1945 by-election	Éamon de Valera (FF)	Seán O'Grady (FF)	Thomas Burke (FP)	Peter O'Loghlen (FF)	Patrick Shanahan (FF)
13th	1948	Éamon de Valera (FF)	Seán O'Grady (FF)	Thomas Burke (FP)	Patrick Hogan (Lab)	4 seats 1948–1969
14th	1951	Éamon de Valera (FF)	Patrick Hillery (FF)	William Murphy (FG)	Patrick Hogan (Lab)	4 seats 1948–1969
15th	1954	Éamon de Valera (FF)	Patrick Hillery (FF)	William Murphy (FG)	Patrick Hogan (Lab)	4 seats 1948–1969
16th	1957	Éamon de Valera (FF)	Patrick Hillery (FF)	William Murphy (FG)	Patrick Hogan (Lab)	4 seats 1948–1969
16th	1959 by-election	Seán Ó Ceallaigh (FF)	Patrick Hillery (FF)	William Murphy (FG)	Patrick Hogan (Lab)	4 seats 1948–1969
17th	1961	Seán Ó Ceallaigh (FF)	Patrick Hillery (FF)	William Murphy (FG)	Patrick Hogan (Lab)	4 seats 1948–1969
18th	1965	Seán Ó Ceallaigh (FF)	Patrick Hillery (FF)	William Murphy (FG)	Patrick Hogan (Lab)	4 seats 1948–1969
18th	1968 by-election	Seán Ó Ceallaigh (FF)	Patrick Hillery (FF)	Sylvester Barrett (FF)	Patrick Hogan (Lab)	4 seats 1948–1969
19th	1969	Frank Taylor (FG)	Patrick Hillery (FF)	Sylvester Barrett (FF)	3 seats 1969–1981	
20th	1973	Frank Taylor (FG)	Brendan Daly (FF)	Sylvester Barrett (FF)	3 seats 1969–1981	
21st	1977	Frank Taylor (FG)	Brendan Daly (FF)	Sylvester Barrett (FF)	3 seats 1969–1981	
22nd	1981	Madeleine Taylor (FG)	Brendan Daly (FF)	Sylvester Barrett (FF)	Bill Loughnane (FF)	4 seats since 1981
23rd	1982 (Feb)	Donal Carey (FG)	Brendan Daly (FF)	Sylvester Barrett (FF)	Bill Loughnane (FF)	4 seats since 1981
24th	1982 (Nov)	Donal Carey (FG)	Brendan Daly (FF)	Sylvester Barrett (FF)	Madeleine Taylor-Quinn (FG)	4 seats since 1981
25th	1987	Donal Carey (FG)	Brendan Daly (FF)	Síle de Valera (FF)	Madeleine Taylor-Quinn (FG)	4 seats since 1981
26th	1989	Donal Carey (FG)	Brendan Daly (FF)	Síle de Valera (FF)	Madeleine Taylor-Quinn (FG)	4 seats since 1981
27th	1992	Donal Carey (FG)	Moosajee Bhamjee (Lab)	Síle de Valera (FF)	Tony Killeen (FF)	4 seats since 1981
28th	1997	Donal Carey (FG)	Brendan Daly (FF)	Síle de Valera (FF)	Tony Killeen (FF)	4 seats since 1981
29th	2002	Pat Breen (FG)	James Breen (Ind.)	Síle de Valera (FF)	Tony Killeen (FF)	4 seats since 1981
30th	2007	Pat Breen (FG)	Joe Carey (FG)	Timmy Dooley (FF)	Tony Killeen (FF)	4 seats since 1981
31st	2011	Pat Breen (FG)	Joe Carey (FG)	Timmy Dooley (FF)	Michael McNamara (Lab)	4 seats since 1981
32nd	2016	Pat Breen (FG)	Joe Carey (FG)	Timmy Dooley (FF)	Michael Harty (Ind.)	4 seats since 1981
33rd	2020	Violet-Anne Wynne (SF)	Joe Carey (FG)	Cathal Crowe (FF)	Michael McNamara (Ind.)	4 seats since 1981
34th	2024	Donna McGettigan (SF)	Joe Cooney (FG)	Cathal Crowe (FF)	Timmy Dooley (FF)	4 seats since 1981
