= Londonderry City (UK Parliament constituency) =

UK parliamentary constituency in Ireland, 1801–1922

- Former borough constituency for the House of Commons
- County: County Londonderry
- Borough: Londonderry

1801–1922
- Seats: 1
- Created from: Londonderry City (IHC)
- Replaced by: Londonderry

Londonderry City was a parliamentary constituency in Ireland, representing the city of Derry in County Londonderry. It returned one Member of Parliament (MP) to the United Kingdom House of Commons on the electoral system of the first past the post.

== Boundaries ==
The parliamentary borough of Londonderry was granted representation in the House of Commons of the United Kingdom under the Acts of Union 1800 which took effect on 1 January 1801. It inherited the boundaries and franchise of the Londonderry City constituency of the abolished Irish House of Commons.

A report on the constituency was conducted in December 1831, proposing a new boundary. The Parliamentary Boundaries (Ireland) Act 1832 defined the boundaries of the parliamentary borough as:

From the Point on the South-west of the City at which Mary Blue's Burn joins the River Foyle, up Mary Blue's Burn to the Point at which the same crosses Stanley's Walk; thence, Westward, along Stanley's Walk to the Point at which the same meets a Road which runs nearly parallel to Mary Blue's Burn; thence, Northward, along the last-mentioned Road to the Point at which the same reaches the Entrance Gate to the Bishop's Demesne and Deer Park; thence, Westward, along the Road which proceeds from the said Entrance Gate to the Point at which the same turns South-westward; thence, Northward, along a small Stream for about Seventy Yards to the Point at which the same meets a Bank which skirts the Southeastern Bank of a circular Plantation, and runs up to the Creggan and Burt Road; thence along the Bank so running to the Creggan and Burt Road to the Point at which the same meets the Creggan and Burt Road; thence along a Ditch which runs from the Northern Side of the Creggan and Burt Road, and nearly opposite to the Point last described, to the Point at which the same meets a small Stream; thence in a straight Line to the North-western Corner of the Enclosure Wall of the Lunatic Asylum; thence along the Northern Enclosure Wall of the Lunatic Asylum, and in a Line in continuation thereof, to the Point at which such Line cuts the River Foyle; thence, Southward, along the River Foyle to the Point at which the same is met, on the Eastern Side, by a Ditch or Bank which forms the Southern Boundary of the Pleasure Grounds of Mr. William Bond; thence along the last-mentioned Ditch or Bank to the Point at which the same meets the Newton Limavady Road; thence, Southward, along the Newton Limavady Road for about Ninety Yards to the Point where the said Road joins the old Strabane Road; thence along the old Strabane Road for about Three hundred and ninety Yards to the Point where the same is met by a narrow Road running therefrom to the Tank; thence, Westward, along the last-mentioned narrow Road for about Thirty Yards to the Spot where the same is met by a Bank, now planted with Bushes, running Southward; thence along the last-mentioned Bank to the Spot where the same is met by a Lane running from Waterside up a steep Hill to the old Strabane Road; thence to the nearest Point of a small Stream which is the Boundary between the Townlands of Clooney and Gobnascale; thence down the said Stream for about Seventy Yards to the Point where the same is met by a Lane running South-westward to the Fields; thence along the last-mentioned Lane to the Point where it cuts the Boundary between the Townlands of Gobnascale and Tamneymore; thence, Westward, along the Boundary between the Townlands of Gobnascale and Tamneymore to the Point at which the same meets the River Foyle; thence, South-ward, along the River Foyle to the Point first described.

Under the Representation of the People (Ireland) Act 1868, its boundaries were extended to include all of the municipal borough of Londonderry. These had been defined in the Municipal Corporations (Ireland) Act 1840 as:

From a stout Masonry Pillar North Side of Gateway at Black Bush Cottage on West Side of the Road to Fahan, Eastward, by a straight Line to the West End of the Brick Wall forming a Part of the North Boundary of the Premises of the Free Grammar School of Foyle Academy; thence, Easterly, along the above-mentioned Brick Wall to its Eastern Termination at the High Road on the Bank of the River Foyle; thence, Eastward, in a straight Line, in continuation of the Line of the Brick Wall last mentioned, until the same arrives at the Point being its Intersection of the ordinary Lowe water Mark on the East Shore of the River Foyle; thence, Southward, along the Line of the ordinary Low-water Mark until such Line is terminated by the Prolongation Westward of the Line of the South Boundary Fence of the Pleasure Grounds of the late William Bond, Esquire; thence, Eastward, along the Line of the above-mentioned Boundary Fence of Pleasure Grounds until it arrives at its Point of Intersection with the East Side of the Road to Newtown Limavady; thence, South-easterly, in a straight Line to a stout Masonry Pillar West Side of a Gateway on the South Side of the Dungiven Road, about Fifty Yards East of Newtown Limavady Road; thence, Southerly, in a straight Line to a Point on the Clondermont Road where the North Boundary Fence of the Tannery Premises of Mr. William M'Carter terminates; thence, South-westerly, in a straight Line to the Point on the Road to Dunymanagh distant Two hundred and fifty Feet from its Point of Junction with the old Strabane Road; thence, Westerly, in a straight Line to the Point on the old Strabane Road where a Lane departs Southerly to the Fields; thence, Westerly, along the old Strabane Road to the South-westernmost Gable of the Houses at Gobnascale on the North-west Side of said old Strabane Road; thence, Westerly, in a straight Line to a Point in the Townland Boundary between Gobnascale and Tamnymore where said Boundary is met by a Lane from the North-east; thence, North-westerly, in continuation and prolongation of the last-mentioned Townland Boundary until it meets and intersects the Line of ordinary Low-water Mark on the East Shore of the River Foyle; thence, South-westerly, along the Line of the ordinary Low-water Mark until it is intersected by a Line drawn from the North-east Angle of Foyle Hill Park, across the River Foyle, to the Cottage about One hundred and sixty Yards East of the Point of Intersection of the Boundary between the Townland of Gobnaseale and Tamnymore and the old Strabane Road; thence, North-westerly, along the intersecting Line just mentioned to the North-east Angle of the Boundary Fence of Foyle Hill Park; thence, North-westerly, along the Boundary Fence of Foyle Hill Park to the Point where it meets Long Moor Lane; thence, North-westerly, along the North Boundary Fence of Foyle Hill Park to a Point Two hundred Feet West of Long Moor Lane; thence, North-easterly, in a straight Line to the North End of the Brick Wall forming the Western Boundary Fence of Walker’s Nurseries; thence, North-easterly, along the Western Boundary of the Nursery Grounds to a Point on the Road to Newton Cunningham where it forms a sharp Angle; thence, Northerly, in a straight Line to a Point in the Avenue leading to the Deer Park at Two hundred Feet distant Westward from the Entrance Gate in Long Moor Lane; thence, North-easterly, in a straight Line to the South-west End of the Rope Walk on the Creggan Road; thence, North-easterly, in a straight Line to a Point in the Lane leading Westward from the Gate at the Black Bush Cottage at One hundred Feet Distance Westward of said Gate; thence, Eastward, One hundred Feet along last-mentioned Lane to the Point on the Fahan Road already described.

It was not affected by the Redistribution of Seats Act 1885 or the Redistribution of Seats (Ireland) Act 1918.

The Government of Ireland Act 1920 established the Parliament of Northern Ireland, which came into operation in 1921. The representation of Northern Ireland in the Parliament of the United Kingdom was reduced from 30 MPs to 13 MPs, taking effect at the 1922 United Kingdom general election. Londonderry City, North Londonderry and South Londonderry were combined to form the single-seat county constituency of Londonderry.

== Politics ==
After the extension of the franchise under the Representation of the People Act 1884, the constituency was one of the most marginal seats in Ireland.

Sinn Féin won in 1918. The MP, Professor Eoin MacNeill, was also returned for National University of Ireland. As MacNeill did not take his seat in the United Kingdom House of Commons he could not choose which constituency he would represent and arrange a by-election in the other. He played an active role in the First Dáil and in the Ministry of Dáil Éireann.

== Members of Parliament ==
Election	MP	Party
1801 co-option	Henry Alexander	Tory
1802	Sir George Hill, Bt	Tory
1830	Sir Robert Ferguson, Bt	Whig
1860 by-election	William McCormick	Irish Conservative
1865	Lord Claud Hamilton	Irish Conservative
1868	Richard Dowse	Liberal
1872 by-election	Charles Lewis	Irish Conservative
1886	Justin McCarthy (Note: Lewis was declared elected at the 1886 general election, but the result was overturned on petition, and the seat awarded to McCarthy.)	Irish Parliamentary
1892	John Ross	Irish Unionist
1895	Edmund Vesey Knox	Irish Parliamentary
1899 by-election	Arthur John Moore	Irish Parliamentary
1900	James Hamilton	Irish Unionist
1913 by-election	David Cleghorn Hogg	Liberal
1914 by-election	James Brown Dougherty	Liberal
1918	Eoin MacNeill	Sinn Féin
1922	Constituency abolished	

== Elections ==
The elections in this constituency were conducted on the electoral system of first past the post.

=== Elections in the 1830s ===
General election 1830: Londonderry City
Party	Candidate	Votes	%
Whig	Robert Ferguson	258	73.5
Tory	John Richard James Hart	87	24.8
Whig	John Montgomery	6	1.7
Majority		171	48.7
Turnout		351	c. 54.0
Registered electors		c. 650	
Whig gain from Tory			

On petition, Ferguson's election was declared void, causing a by-election.

By-election, 2 April 1831: Londonderry City
Party	Candidate	Votes	%	±%
Whig	Robert Ferguson	202	76.5	+3.0
Tory	John Richard James Hart	62	23.5	−1.3
Majority		140	53.0	+4.3
Turnout		264	c. 40.6	c. −13.4
Registered electors		c. 650		
Whig hold		Swing	+2.2	

General election 1831: Londonderry City
Party	Candidate	Votes	%	±%
Whig	Robert Ferguson	205	77.4	+3.9
Whig	Conolly McClausland Lecky	60	22.6	N/A
Majority		145	54.8	+6.1
Turnout		265	40.8	c. −13.2
Registered electors		650		
Whig hold		Swing	+3.9	

General election 1832: Londonderry City
Party	Candidate	Votes	%	±%
Whig	Robert Ferguson	308	57.7	−19.7
Tory	George Robert Dawson	226	42.3	New
Majority		82	15.4	−39.4
Turnout		534	87.4	+46.6
Registered electors		611		
Whig hold		Swing	−19.7	

General election 1835: Londonderry City
Party	Candidate	Votes	%
Whig	Robert Ferguson	Unopposed	
Registered electors		703	
Whig hold			

General election 1837: Londonderry City
Party	Candidate	Votes	%
Whig	Robert Ferguson	212	60.7
Conservative	George Robert Dawson	137	39.3
Majority		75	21.4
Turnout		349	43.4
Registered electors		804	
Whig hold			

=== Elections in the 1840s ===
General election 1841: Londonderry City
Party	Candidate	Votes	%	±%
Whig	Robert Ferguson	Unopposed		
Registered electors		742		
Whig hold				

General election 1847: Londonderry City
Party	Candidate	Votes	%	±%
Whig	Robert Ferguson	Unopposed		
Registered electors		1,904		
Whig hold				

=== Elections in the 1850s ===
General election 1852: Londonderry City
Party	Candidate	Votes	%	±%
Whig	Robert Ferguson	Unopposed		
Registered electors		724		
Whig hold				

General election 1857: Londonderry City
Party	Candidate	Votes	%	±%
Whig	Robert Ferguson	Unopposed		
Registered electors		825		
Whig hold				

General election 1859: Londonderry City
Party	Candidate	Votes	%	±%
Liberal	Robert Ferguson	Unopposed		
Registered electors		825		
Liberal hold				

=== Elections in the 1860s ===
Ferguson's death caused a by-election.

By-election, 2 April 1860: Londonderry City
Party	Candidate	Votes	%	±%
Irish Conservative	William McCormick	326	45.6	New
Liberal	Samuel MacCurdy Greer	307	42.9	N/A
Liberal	George Skipton	82	11.5	N/A
Majority		19	2.7	N/A
Turnout		715	86.7	N/A
Registered electors		825		
Conservative gain from Liberal		Swing	N/A	

General election 1865: Londonderry City
Party	Candidate	Votes	%	±%
Irish Conservative	Claud Hamilton	379	53.4	N/A
Liberal	Samuel MacCurdy Greer	331	46.6	N/A
Majority		48	6.8	N/A
Turnout		710	81.1	N/A
Registered electors		876		
Conservative gain from Liberal		Swing	N/A	

General election 1868: Londonderry City
Party	Candidate	Votes	%	±%
Liberal	Richard Dowse	704	54.0	+7.4
Irish Conservative	Claud Hamilton	599	46.0	−7.4
Majority		105	8.0	N/A
Turnout		1,303	87.9	+6.8
Registered electors		1,483		
Liberal gain from Conservative		Swing	+7.4	

=== Elections in the 1870s ===
Dowse was appointed Solicitor-General for Ireland, requiring a by-election.

By-election, 15 Feb 1870: Londonderry City
Party	Candidate	Votes	%	±%
Liberal	Richard Dowse	680	53.5	−0.5
Irish Conservative	Robert Baxter	592	46.5	+0.5
Majority		88	7.0	−1.0
Turnout		1,272	85.8	−2.1
Registered electors		1,483		
Liberal hold		Swing	−0.5	

Dowse resigned after being appointed Chief Baron of the Irish Exchequer, causing a by-election.

By-election, 27 Nov 1872: Londonderry City
Party	Candidate	Votes	%	±%
Irish Conservative	Charles Lewis	696	53.2	+7.2
Liberal	Christopher Palles	522	39.9	−14.1
Home Rule	Joseph Biggar	89	6.8	New
Irish Conservative	Bartholomew McCorkell	2	0.2	N/A
Majority		174	13.3	N/A
Turnout		1,309	80.7	−7.2
Registered electors		1,622		
Irish Conservative gain from Liberal		Swing	+10.7	

General election 1874: Londonderry City
Party	Candidate	Votes	%	±%
Irish Conservative	Charles Lewis	744	51.0	+5.0
Liberal	Bartholomew McCorkell	715	49.0	−5.0
Majority		29	2.0	N/A
Turnout		1,459	86.6	−1.3
Registered electors		1,685		
Irish Conservative gain from Liberal		Swing	+5.0	

=== Elections in the 1880s ===
General election 1880: Londonderry City
Party	Candidate	Votes	%	±%
Irish Conservative	Charles Lewis	964	52.4	+1.4
Liberal	Adam Hogg	876	47.6	−1.4
Majority		88	4.8	+2.8
Turnout		1,840	91.8	+5.2
Registered electors		2,005		
Irish Conservative hold		Swing	+1.4	

1885 general election: Londonderry City
Party	Candidate	Votes	%	±%
Irish Conservative	Charles Lewis	1,824	50.4	−2.0
Irish Parliamentary	Justin McCarthy	1,792	49.6	New
Majority		32	0.8	−4.0
Turnout		3,616	93.2	+1.4
Registered electors		3,879		
Irish Conservative hold		Swing	N/A	

1886 general election: Londonderry City
Party	Candidate	Votes	%	±%
Irish Conservative	Charles Lewis	1,781	50.0	−0.4
Irish Parliamentary	Justin McCarthy	1,778	50.0	+0.4
Majority		3	0.0	N/A
Turnout		3,559	91.8	−1.4
Registered electors		3,879		
Irish Conservative hold		Swing	−0.4	

On petition, Lewis was unseated. McCarthy was named as MP on 25 October.

=== Elections in the 1890s ===
1892 general election: Londonderry City
Party	Candidate	Votes	%	±%
Irish Unionist	John Ross	1,986	50.3	+0.3
Irish National Federation	Justin McCarthy	1,960	49.7	−0.3
Majority		26	0.6	+0.6
Turnout		3,946	94.8	+3.0
Registered electors		4,161		
Irish Unionist hold		Swing	+0.3	

1895 general election: Londonderry City
Party	Candidate	Votes	%	±%
Irish National Federation	Edmund Vesey Knox	2,033	50.5	+0.8
Irish Unionist	John Ross	1,994	49.5	−0.8
Majority		39	1.0	N/A
Turnout		4,027	96.1	+1.3
Registered electors		4,191		
Irish National Federation gain from Irish Unionist		Swing	+0.8	

Knox resigns, triggering a by-election.

By-election, 1899: Londonderry City
Party	Candidate	Votes	%	±%
Irish Parliamentary	Arthur John Moore	2,343	50.5	0.0
Liberal Unionist	Emerson Herdman	2,301	49.5	0.0
Majority		42	1.0	0.0
Turnout		4,644	95.7	−0.4
Registered electors		4,855		
Irish Parliamentary hold		Swing	0.0	

=== Elections in the 1900s ===
1900 general election: Londonderry City
Party	Candidate	Votes	%	±%
Irish Unionist	James Hamilton	2,361	50.7	+1.2
Irish Parliamentary	Arthur John Moore	2,294	49.3	−1.2
Majority		67	1.4	N/A
Turnout		4,655	92.1	−4.0
Registered electors		5,056		
Irish Unionist gain from Irish National Federation		Swing	+1.2	

- Results are compared to the 1895 election, not the by-election.

Hamilton is appointed Treasurer of the Household, prompting a by-election in which he stood unopposed.

By-election, 1903: Londonderry City
Party	Candidate	Votes	%	±%
Irish Unionist	James Hamilton	Unopposed		
Irish Unionist hold				

1906 general election: Londonderry City
Party	Candidate	Votes	%	±%
Irish Unionist	James Hamilton	Unopposed		
Irish Unionist hold				

=== Elections in the 1910s ===
January 1910 general election: Londonderry City
Party	Candidate	Votes	%	±%
Irish Unionist	James Hamilton	2,435	50.6	N/A
Irish Parliamentary	Shane Randolph Leslie	2,378	49.4	New
Majority		57	1.2	New
Turnout		4,813	95.0	N/A
Registered electors		5,068		
Irish Unionist hold		Swing	N/A	

December 1910 general election: Londonderry City
Party	Candidate	Votes	%	±%
Irish Unionist	James Hamilton	2,415	51.1	+0.5
Irish Parliamentary	Shane Randolph Leslie	2,310	48.9	−0.5
Majority		105	2.2	+1.0
Turnout		4,725	93.2	−1.8
Registered electors		5,068		
Irish Unionist hold		Swing	+0.5	

Hamilton becomes Duke of Abercorn, prompting a by-election.

By-election 1913: Londonderry City
Party	Candidate	Votes	%	±%
Liberal	David Cleghorn Hogg	2,699	50.5	New
Irish Unionist	Hercules Pakenham	2,642	49.5	−1.6
Majority		57	1.0	N/A
Turnout		5,341	97.6	+4.4
Registered electors		5,470		
Liberal gain from Irish Unionist		Swing	N/A	

Hogg's death prompts another by-election.

By-election, 1914: Londonderry City
Party	Candidate	Votes	%	±%
Liberal	James Brown Dougherty	Unopposed		
Liberal hold				

1918 general election: Londonderry City
Party	Candidate	Votes	%	±%
Sinn Féin	Eoin MacNeill	7,335	50.7	New
Irish Unionist	Robert Newton Anderson	7,020	48.5	−2.6
Irish Parliamentary	William Hamilton Davey	120	0.8	−48.1
Majority		315	2.2	N/A
Turnout		14,475	86.5	−6.7
Registered electors		16,736		
Sinn Féin gain from Liberal		Swing	N/A	

- Results are compared to the December 1910 election, not the later by-elections.
- In common with other Sinn Féin MPs, Eoin MacNeill abstained from Westminster and took his seat as a TD in the First Dáil. He was also elected for the National University.

== See also ==
- List of United Kingdom Parliament constituencies in Ireland and Northern Ireland
- List of MPs elected in the 1918 United Kingdom general election
- Historic Dáil constituencies

== Sources ==
- The Parliaments of England by Henry Stooks Smith (1st edition published in three volumes 1844–50), 2nd edition edited (in one volume) by F.W.S. Craig (Political Reference Publications 1973)
- Walker, Brian M., ed. (1978). Parliamentary Election Results in Ireland, 1801–1922. Dublin: Royal Irish Academy. pp. 227, 295–296, 361–362, 392. ISBN 0901714127.
- Who's Who of British members of parliament: Volume I 1832–1885, edited by M. Stenton (The Harvester Press 1976)
- Stenton, M.; Lees, S., eds. (1978). Who's Who of British members of parliament: Volume II 1886–1918. The Harvester Press.
- Stenton, M.; Lees, S., eds. (1979). Who's Who of British members of parliament: Volume III 1919–1945. The Harvester Press.
- Leigh Rayment's Historical List of MPs – Constituencies beginning with "L" (part 4 )
