= McFarland baronets =

Baronetcy in the Baronetage of the United Kingdom

- Escutcheon of the McFarland baronets of Aberfoyle
- Creation date: 1914
- Status: vacant
- Motto: This I'll defend

The McFarland Baronetcy, of Aberfoyle in the County of Londonderry, is a title in the Baronetage of the United Kingdom. It was created on 23 January 1914 for the Irish businessman John McFarland. He was founder of and a partner in the firm of McCrea and McFarland, engineering contractors, of Belfast and Derry, Chairman of Mulhollands, drapers, and owner of the Lough Swilly Steamship Company, and also served as Mayor of Londonderry. He was succeeded by his son, the second Baronet. He was a businessman, a Senator of Northern Ireland, Mayor of Londonderry, Lord Lieutenant of the City of Londonderry and an Irish Rugby union international. The third Baronet was a member of the Londonderry Corporation and a Deputy Lieutenant of the City of the County of Londonderry from 1956 to 1982.

== McFarland baronets, of Aberfoyle (1914) ==
- Sir John McFarland, 1st Baronet (1848–1926)
- Sir Basil Alexander Talbot McFarland, 2nd Baronet (1898–1986)
- Sir John Talbot McFarland, 3rd Baronet (1927–2020)
- Sir Anthony Basil Scott McFarland, 4th Baronet (born 1959);

The heir apparent is the present holder's son Max Anthony McFarland (born 1993).
