= Londonderry City (Parliament of Ireland constituency) =

Pre-1801 Irish constituency

- Former borough constituency for the Irish House of Commons
- County: County Londonderry
- Borough: Londonderry

–1801
- Replaced by: Londonderry City (UKHC)

Londonderry City was a constituency represented in the Irish House of Commons until 1800.

== Members of Parliament ==
- 1613–1615: George Cary and Thomas Crewe
- 1634–1635: Sir Robert Farrar and Robert Goodwin
- 1639–1649: Sir Robert Stewart and Sir Francis Butler
- 1661–1666: John Godbold (died and replaced 1665 by John Gorges) and Hugh Edwards

=== 1692–1801 ===
Election	First MP	Second MP
1692	David Cairnes	Bartholomew Van Homrigh
1703	James Lenox	Charles Norman
1713	John Newton	Charles Norman
1715	George Tomkins	Charles Norman
1727	George Tomkins	Thomas Upton
1733	George Tomkins	Robert Norman
1739	William Scott	Robert Norman
1743	William Scott	Frederick Cary-Hamilton
1747	William Scott	Henry Hamilton
February 1760	William Hamilton	Henry Hamilton
April 1760	Alexander Stewart	Henry Hamilton
May 1760	William Hamilton	Henry Hamilton
1761	Francis Andrews	Henry Hamilton
1768	Francis Andrews	Hugh Hill
1775	James Alexander	Hugh Hill
1790	William Lecky	Hugh Hill
1795	William Lecky	Sir George Hill, 2nd Bt
January 1798	Henry Alexander	Sir George Hill, 2nd Bt
1798	Henry Alexander	Andrew Ferguson
1801	Replaced by Westminster constituency Londonderry City	
