= High Sheriff of Londonderry City =

Judicial representative in Derry

The High Sheriff of Londonderry City, or High Sheriff of Derry, is the sovereign's judicial representative in the city of Derry. High Sheriff of Londonderry is a title and position which was created in 1900 under the Local Government (Ireland) Act 1898, with Sir John Barre Johnson the first holder. Prior to this, the Sheriff of the City and County of Londonderry represented the city as being part of County Londonderry. Like other high sheriff positions, it is largely a ceremonial post today. The appointment is officially made by the Secretary of State for Northern Ireland on behalf of the King. The outgoing high sheriff nominates his or her successor.

== High Sheriffs of the City of Londonderry ==
- 1900: Sir John Barre Johnston
- 1903: Matthew Anderson Ballantine
- 1904: Sir John McFarland, 1st Baronet
- 1914–1923: Horace Bayer of Southwood, Silverdale, London S.E.
- 1924: John Burns
- 1925: Robert Watson
- 1926: James Mark
- 1927: James Colhoun
- 1928: Joseph H. Welch
- 1929: Robert H. Smith
- 1930–1938: Colonel Sir Basil Alexander Talbot McFarland, 2nd Baronet
- 1939: Frederick Simmons
- 1940–1941: James Hamilton
- 1942–1945: John J. Buchanan
- 1946–1949: Arthur Harold Noble
- 1950–1952: Arthur William Richards
- 1952: Colonel Sir Basil Alexander Talbot McFarland, 2nd Baronet of Aberfoyle (also High Sheriff of County Londonderry)
- 1953–1954: John James Hill
- 1955–1956: Samuel Reginald Cochrane
- 1957–1958: James Curry Hamilton
- 1959–1960: James Anderson Piggot
- 1961: Daniel McLean McDonald
- 1962–1963: Joseph Alexander Love Johnston
- 1964:
- 1965–1966: John Talbot McFarland
- 1967–1968: John Alexander Canning
- 1969: Adam R. Laurie
- 1970: Liam McCormick
- 1971: Thomas Fitzpatrick Cooke
- 1972: Ronald Marsden Harvey
- 1973–1974: D. J. T. Gilliland
- 1975: Henry Frederick Dougan Stevenson
- 1976: Francis Gerard Guckian
- 1977: Desmond Gilbert Cromie Whyte
- 1978: Brian Glancy
- 1979: Samuel John Black
- 1980: John Vance Arthur
- 1981: James Edward O'Donnell
- 1982: P. I. O'Doherty
- 1984: J. Hart
- 1985: A. O. Kennedy
- 1986:
- 1991: E. P. Harvey of Drumahoe
- 1992: D. A. J. Keegan of Culmore
- 1993: T. E. W. Huey of Londonderry
- 1994: G. F. W. Price of Londonderry
- 1995: Michael G. A. Black of Caw
- 1996: Derek Curtis of Londonderry
- 1997: Stuart C. Keys of Molenan
- 1998: Alan David McClure of Londonderry
- 1999: Mar Hasson of Londonderry

=== 21st century ===
- 2000: William Francis Graham Hunter
- 2001: Florence M. M. Sloan
- 2002: John Charles McGinnis of Eglinton
- 2003: John Carson Ian Warnock of Londonderry
- 2004: Margaret Claire Lee of Londonderry
- 2005: Ian Alexander Young of Londonderry
- 2006: Jack Andrew Clark McFarland of Claudy
- 2007: Richard John Sterling of Coleraine
- 2008: Eamon Gee
- 2009: Ian William Crowe
- 2010: Hugh Christopher Hegarty
- 2011: Steven Lindsay
- 2012: Ann Murray Cavanagh
- 2013: James Kerr
- 2014: Jonathan Snyder
- 2014: Robert Dunn of Caw Park
- 2015: Vindi Torney
- 2016: Patricia O'Kane of Londonderry
- 2017: Mary Bradley of Ballyshaskey
- 2018: Agnes Geraldine Gavin of Londonderry
- 2019: Julia Elizabeth Kee of Londonderry
- 2020: James Richard Doherty of Prehen
- 2021:Linda Heaney, Londonderry
- 2022:Paul Howie of Deanfield, Londonderry
- 2023: Angela Norma Mary Thompson of Londonderry
