= Richard Dowse =

Irish politician, barrister and judge

Richard Dowse PC
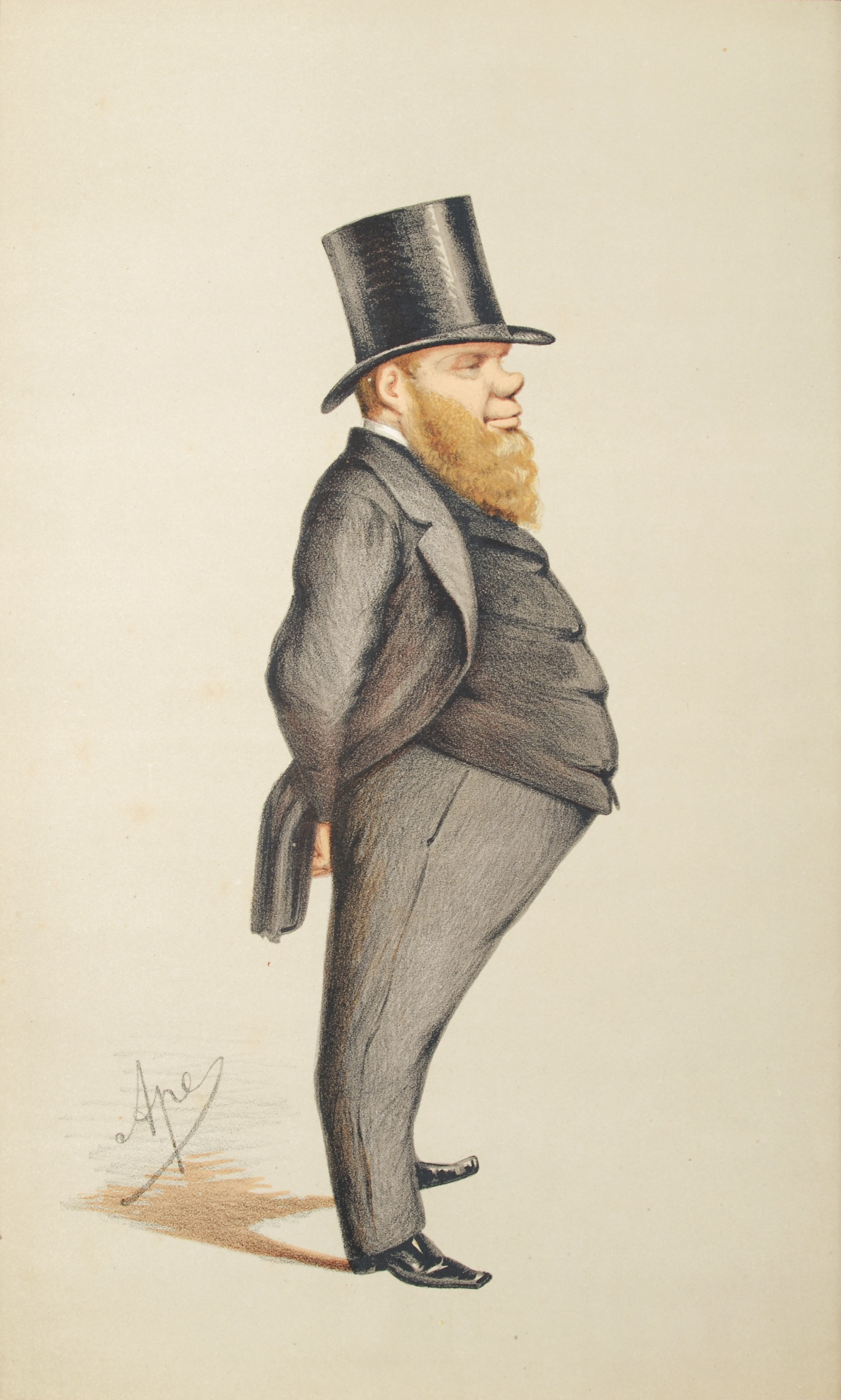
- Caricature by Ape published in Vanity Fair in 1871.

Member of Parliament for Londonderry City
- In office 1868–1872
- Preceded by: Lord Claud Hamilton
- Succeeded by: Charles Edward Lewis

Richard Dowse PC (1824 – 14 March 1890) was an Irish politician, barrister and judge, who was reputed to be the wittiest Parliamentary orator of his time.

== Background ==
He was born in Dungannon, County Tyrone, eldest son of William Dowse, a merchant and Maria Donaldson, daughter of Captain Hugh Donaldson and Mary Vance. He was educated at the Royal School Dungannon and Trinity College Dublin. As a student, he was briefly involved in the Young Ireland movement. He entered Lincoln's Inn in 1849 and was called to the Irish Bar in 1852. Though he was not a particularly good lawyer: ("he was better known for his wit than his law", a later judge commented sourly), his witty, occasionally scandalous speeches guaranteed him attention and regular press coverage. After practising for some years on the North-Western Circuit, he became Queen's Counsel in 1863 and Third Serjeant in 1867.

== Later career ==
He was elected as Member of Parliament (MP) for Londonderry City at the 1868 general election. He was appointed a Baron of the Court of Exchequer (Ireland) in 1872, having served briefly as Attorney-General and Solicitor-General for Ireland Dowse resided at 38 Mountjoy Square in Dublin's north city centre.

He died suddenly of an apparent heart attack while holding the assizes in Tralee, County Kerry in March 1890. His health had been bad for some time, and he had apparently gone on his last circuit with some trepidation, remarking "I do not want to die in Kerry".

== Family ==
On 29 December 1852, he married Catherine (Kate) Moore, daughter of George Moore of Clones, and they had one son and three daughters, including Charlotte (1855–1934), who married Sir William Sullivan, 3rd Baronet (1860–1937), third son of another eminent judge, Sir Edward Sullivan, 1st Baronet.

Kate died in 1874.

== Reputation ==
He was considered one of the finest and wittiest Parliamentary speakers of the age, and had the ability to crush an opposing speaker. When John Thomas Ball, a future Lord Chancellor of Ireland, asked for the date of a certain event, Dowse replied gravely that he did not have the precise date, but he thought it was about the time when Ball changed his political allegiance in the hope of getting into the House of Commons.

By comparison with his political speeches, his judgements are generally rather dull, and have little value as precedents. He never had much reputation as a lawyer, although he had the virtues of common sense, clarity and simplicity. Delaney refers to a complex habeas corpus application which Dowse disposed of by saying simply "I'm afraid the prisoner must remain in gaol, and he occasionally showed a touch of his celebrated wit in his judgements.

Maurice Healy tells the story of a later judge who refused to follow a judgement of Dowse's, saying unkindly that "the learned Baron was always better known for his wit than his law". Counsel then gravely embarrassed the judge by pointing out that the House of Lords had given an identical judgment.

== Legacy ==
His obituary notice in The Times of 15 March 1890, read

Mr. Baron Dowse was a self-made man, who, without social advantages, forced his way by his own merit to the eminent position which he occupied.... He gave at all times free and vivid utterance to his thoughts, without waiting to examine critically the terms in which he should mould them. These were often quaint and graphic, with a dash of wit and humour, which, if a little wanting in dignity, ... gave emphasis and force to an argument or comment.

On his retirement from the House of Commons, Punch magazine published a warm tribute to a man whose humour had been "like an oasis in the desert".

Elrington Ball described him as a man who combined great wit with incisive intelligence and a knowledge of the world.

Parliament of the United Kingdom
Preceded by Lord Claud Hamilton	Member of Parliament for Londonderry City; 1868 – 1872	Succeeded by Charles Edward Lewis
Legal offices
Preceded by Charles Robert Barry	Solicitor General for Ireland; 1870–1872	Succeeded by Christopher Palles
Preceded by Charles Robert Barry	Attorney General for Ireland; 1872	Succeeded by Christopher Palles
