= Hercules Pakenham =

British Army officer and politician (1863–1937)

Hercules Pakenham CMG DL JP

Senate of Northern Ireland
- In office 1928–1937

London County Councillor
- In office 1910–1913
- Constituency: Marylebone East

High Sheriff of Antrim
- In office 1906
- Preceded by: Milne Barbour
- Succeeded by: James Graham Leslie

Personal details
- Born: 17 February 1863
- Died: 28 March 1937 (aged 74)
- Party: Ulster Unionist Party
- Other political affiliations: Municipal Reform Party
- Relations: Thomas Pakenham (Father)
- Education: Eton College; Royal Military Academy Sandhurst

Military service
- Allegiance: United Kingdom
- Branch/service: British Army
- Years of service: 1883–1917
- Rank: Colonel
- Unit: Grenadier Guards (1883–1898); 4th (Militia) Battalion of the Royal Irish Rifles (1898–1902); London Irish Rifles (1906–?); 11th (Service) Battalion, Royal Irish Rifles (1914–1917)
- Battles/wars: World War I
- Espionage activity
- Agency: Security Service (MI5)
- Service years: 1917–?

Colonel Hercules Arthur Pakenham CMG DL JP (17 February 1863 – 28 March 1937) was a unionist politician in Northern Ireland.

A member of the Pakenham family headed by the Earl of Longford, he was the eldest son of Lieutenant-General Thomas Pakenham, by Elizabeth Clarke, daughter of William Clarke, of New York City. He was educated at Eton and the Royal Military College Sandhurst from which he was commissioned as an officer in the Grenadier Guards in 1883. He held posts as aide-de-camp to the Governor General of Canada from 1886 to 1888, and to the Governor-General of India from 1888 to 1893. The following year he was promoted to captain on 12 September 1894. In 1898 he was promoted to the rank of major in the 4th (Militia) Battalion of the Royal Irish Rifles. He acted as private secretary to the Governor of Victoria from 1898 to 1900, and in June 1902 was again seconded from his regiment for service under the Colonial Office. He resigned his commission in the militia on 27 September 1902. In 1906 he became lieutenant-colonel and commanding officer of the London Irish Rifles, a unit of the Middlesex Rifle Volunteers.

A major landowner in County Antrim, he served as High Sheriff of the county in 1906.

In 1910 he entered local politics when he was elected to the London County Council as a Municipal Reform Party councillor for Marylebone East. He unsuccessfully sought election in 1913 to the United Kingdom Parliament when he contested the Londonderry City by-election as a Unionist, being defeated by a Liberal by just 57 votes.

When the First World War broke out he raised and commanded the 11th (Service) Battalion Royal Irish Rifles. He worked for MI5 during the latter part of the war. In 1917 he was MI5's liaison at the French War Ministry. In early 1918 he became head of MI5's Washington D.C. office.

Pakenham was elected as an Ulster Unionist Party member of the Senate of Northern Ireland in 1928 and served until 1937.

Pakenham married Lillian Blanche Georgiana Ashley, daughter of Evelyn Ashley and sister of Lord Mount Temple, in 1895. They had one son and two daughters. He died in March 1937, aged 74. His wife survived him by two years and died in September 1939, aged 64.

Honorary titles
Preceded by John Milne Barbour	High Sheriff of Antrim; 1906	Succeeded by James Graham Leslie
