= Lord-Lieutenant of Greater London =

Representative of the British monarch

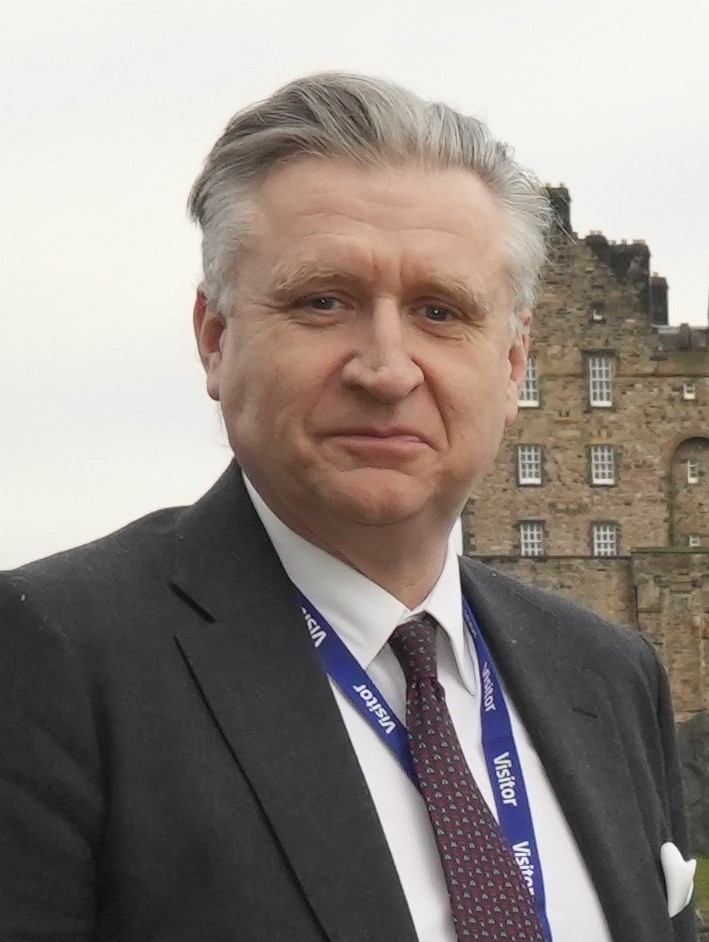
- Incumbent; Sir Alastair King since 14 October 2026
- Appointer: King Charles III
- Term length: Until the incumbent reaches the age of 75.
- Inaugural holder: Harold, Earl Alexander of Tunis KG
- Formation: 1965
- Salary: Voluntary
- Website: http://greaterlondonlieutenancy.com

The Lord-Lieutenant of Greater London is the personal representative of the monarch, currently King Charles III, in Greater London.

Each Lord-Lieutenant is assisted in largely ceremonial duties by Deputy Lieutenants whom he appoints. The Lieutenancy Office is based at Whitehall, London SW1.

The Lord-Lieutenant is also assisted by a Lord-Lieutenant's Cadet, one from each branch of the main cadet forces, Army Cadet Force, Air Training Corps and Sea Cadet Corps. The cadet is selected by the Lord-Lieutenant. The Lord-Lieutenant's Cadets are from the county of the Lord-Lieutenant.

Created under the Administration of Justice Act (1964), this office merged those of Lord-Lieutenant of the County of London (cr. 1889) and the ancient Lord-Lieutenancy of Middlesex. The ceremonial county of Greater London does not include the City of London, which has its own Commission of Lieutenancy.

== List of Lord-Lieutenants of Greater London ==
From 1965, the following have served as Lord-Lieutenant of Greater London:

- 1 Apr 1965 – 1966: Harold Alexander, 1st Earl Alexander of Tunis;
- 28 Dec 1966 – 1973: Sir Gerald Templer;
- 12 Sep 1973 – 1978: Charles Elworthy, Baron Elworthy;
- 1 Jul 1978 – 1986: Norah Phillips, Baroness Phillips;
- 31 Jan 1986 – 1998: Edwin Bramall, Baron Bramall;
- 21 Dec 1998 – 2008: Peter Imbert, Baron Imbert;
- 27 Apr 2008 – 2015: Sir David Brewer;
- 29 May 2015 – 13 October 2026: Sir Kenneth Olisa;
- 14 October 2026 – Present: Sir Alastair King

== See also ==
- Custos rotulorum
- Lord-Lieutenant
