= Lord Lieutenant of the County of London =

Civil post in London, England

This is a list of people who formerly served as Lord Lieutenant of the County of London.

The post was created in 1889, absorbing the duties of the Lord Lieutenant of the Tower Hamlets, and abolished in 1965, when it was merged with that of Lord Lieutenant of Middlesex to become the Lord Lieutenant of Greater London.

- Hugh Grosvenor, 1st Duke of Westminster 1 April 1889 – 22 December 1899
- Alexander Duff, 1st Duke of Fife 12 February 1900 – 12 January 1912
- Robert Crewe-Milnes, 1st Marquess of Crewe 24 June 1912 – 5 July 1944
- Gerald Wellesley, 7th Duke of Wellington 5 July 1944 – 13 September 1949
- Archibald Wavell, 1st Earl Wavell 13 September 1949 – 24 May 1950
- Alan Brooke, 1st Viscount Alanbrooke 23 August 1950 – 25 April 1957
- Harold Alexander, 1st Earl Alexander of Tunis 17 May 1957 – 1965

== See also ==
- High Sheriff of the County of London
