= Earl Alexander =

Earl Alexander may refer to:

- Earl Alexander of Tunis, a title created in 1952 for Harold Alexander, 1st Viscount Alexander of Tunis
- Earl Alexander of Hillsborough (1885–1965), a title created in 1963 for A. V. Alexander, 1st Viscount Alexander of Hillsborough
