= Margaret Alexander, Countess Alexander of Tunis =

British aristocrat and activist (1905–1977)

The Right Honourable The Countess Alexander of Tunis GBE, DStJ

Personal details
- Born: 16 September 1905 Marylebone, London, England
- Died: 17 August 1977 (aged 71) Bracknell, Berkshire, England
- Spouse: Harold Alexander (m. 1931)
- Children: 4, including Shane
- Parent: George Bingham (father)
- Relatives: George Bingham (brother); Herbert Spender-Clay (uncle)

Margaret Diana Alexander, Countess Alexander of Tunis, GBE, DStJ (née Bingham; 16 September 1905 – 17 August 1977), styled Lady Margaret Alexander from 1931 to 1946, and Viscountess Alexander of Tunis from 1946 to 1952; was a British aristocrat and charity activist who served as viceregal consort of Canada.

== Biography ==
Born in Marylebone, she was the youngest of four children born to George Bingham, Lord Bingham (later the Earl of Lucan), and Violet Sylvia Blanche Spender-Clay, sister of Herbert Spender-Clay. She was educated at Notting Hill High School. On 14 October 1931, she married Harold Alexander. He was a future field marshal and was created Viscount Alexander of Tunis in 1946 and Earl Alexander of Tunis in 1952.

Owing to her husband's career, the family moved frequently, and they lived in 36 homes during their marriage, during which time she held several prominent roles. In 1946, on her husband's appointment as Governor General of Canada, she became viceregal consort and châtelaine of Rideau Hall. In recognition of this she was made a Dame Grand Cross of the Order of the British Empire in 1954.

She held the office of Justice of the Peace (JP) for Berkshire from 1956 to 1975. In 1970, while living at Windsor Great Park, she was appointed a Deputy Lord Lieutenant of Berkshire, one of the first women to hold the role of JP.

Lady Margaret was active at the Women's Voluntary Service during the Second World War, working for the department in charge of evacuation of small children. She was Vice-Chairman of the WVS 1952–53 and served on the board of the English-Speaking Union from 1953 to 1971. Between 1960 and 1965, she established the Winston Churchill Memorial Trust at the ESU. She served as chairman of the Juvenile Court of Windsor County Division, and set up a probation hostel for young men in the area, visiting the hostel weekly from 1965 to 1976.

She died in Bracknell, Berkshire, in 1977, aged 71.

== Family and issue ==
The Alexanders had three children and adopted a fourth, Susan.

- Lady Rose Maureen Alexander (born 28 October 1932, and died 21 August 2017), who married Lt. Col. Humphrey Crossman
- Shane William Desmond Alexander, 2nd Earl Alexander of Tunis (born 30 June 1935)
- Brian James Alexander CMG (born 31 July 1939), who is heir presumptive to the title
- Lady Susan Mary Alexander (born 26 February 1948), married Andrew Paulet Hamilton

Honorary titles
| Preceded by The Countess of Athlone | Viceregal Consort of Canada; 1946–1952 | Succeeded by Lilias Massey (as Châtelaine of Rideau Hall) |
