= Lord-Lieutenant's Cadet =

The Lord-Lieutenant's Cadet is seen as the aide and representative of the cadet forces to the British royal family and the Lord-lieutenant in an administrative county of England, Scotland, Wales & Northern Ireland. Typically, one is chosen from each of the main cadet forces, the Army Cadet Force, Air Training Corps and Sea Cadets (United Kingdom). Occasionally, one may also be chosen from the Combined Cadet Force, Police cadets or the St John Ambulance Cadets. They are selected each year at the Lord-Lieutenant's awards in each county.

They provide an essential link between the armed forces and the local community, assist with recruiting within the cadet forces and assist the county's Reserve Forces and Cadets Association. The cadet from each arm of the cadet forces is selected and appointed based on their outreach and participation within their squadron, detachment or unit, and is seen as one of the highest achievements in the Cadet Forces.

== Bedfordshire ==
Lord-Lieutenant's Cadet
- Incumbent; CWO Tegan Dodimead since 3 October 2022
- Appointer: Lord Lieutenant of Bedfordshire
- Term length: One Year

== Belfast ==
Lord-Lieutenant's Cadet of Belfast
- Incumbent; Cdt Sgt Matthew Neilly since 2022
- Abbreviation: LLCofBACF
- Appointer: Lord-Lieutenant of Belfast
- Term length: One Year

Lord-Lieutenant's Cadet of Belfast
- Incumbent; AC Alexandra Sargent since 2022
- Abbreviation: LLCofBSCC
- Appointer: Lord-Lieutenant of Belfast
- Term length: One Year

Lord-Lieutenant's Cadet of Belfast
- Incumbent; Cdt Sgt Bertie Turkington since 2022
- Abbreviation: LLCofBATC
- Appointer: Lord-Lieutenant of Belfast
- Term length: One Year

== Greater London ==
The Lord-Lieutenant's Cadets from the administrative county of Greater London (as of 1965) are appointed from one of the four "quadrants" of London. The locally elected cadets are then decided on, separately, rather than county-wide, like the other counties of the United Kingdom. The current Lord Lieutenant's Cadets of Greater London assumed position on 11 May 2023 and will hold their position until 11 May 2024.

Lord-Lieutenant's Cadet of Greater London
- Incumbent; Cdt Sgt Sam Catmur since 11 May 2023
- Abbreviation: LLCofGLACF
- Appointer: Lord-Lieutenant of Greater London
- Term length: One Year
- Succession: Cdt Cpl Mazin Hanafil
- Website: Greater London Lieutenancy

Lord-Lieutenant's Cadet of Greater London
- Incumbent; Cdt FS Robert Johnson since 11 May 2023
- Abbreviation: LLCofGLATC
- Appointer: Lord-Lieutenant of Greater London
- Term length: One Year
- Succession: Cdt FS Mariam Mohsin
- Website: Greater London Lieutenancy

Lord-Lieutenant's Cadet of Greater London
- Incumbent; POC Malika Wakilzada since 11 May 2023
- Abbreviation: LLCofGLSCC
- Appointer: Lord-Lieutenant of Greater London
- Term length: One Year
- Succession: LC Erin Williams
- Website: Greater London Lieutenancy

== Merseyside ==
Candidates for the position of Lord-Lieutenant's Cadet for Merseyside are nominated from the Sea Cadet Corps, Army Cadet Force and Royal Air Force Air Cadets as part of the same process to identify nominations for the Lord-Lieutenant's awards that year. Candidates are sifted by the Board of NW RFCA (The Reserve Forces’ & Cadets' Association for the North West of England & the Isle of Man) and shortlisted individuals are interviewed by the Lord-Lieutenant. The appointment is ratified in early summer with the successful individual(s) taking post in September.

Lord-Lieutenant's Cadet of Merseyside
- Incumbent; CWO Aaron Scarth since 1 September 2025
- 1913 (Knotty Ash) Squadron
- Appointer: Lord-Lieutenant of Merseyside
- Term length: One Year

Lord-Lieutenant's Cadet of Merseyside
- Incumbent; CWO Ben Kirby since 1 September 2025
- St. Mary's College CCF
- Appointer: Lord-Lieutenant of Merseyside
- Term length: One Year

== Mid Glamorgan ==
Lord-Lieutenant's Cadet of Mid Glamorgan
- Incumbent; Cdt FS Emily Richards since 30 January 2023
- Abbreviation: LLCofMidGlam
- Appointer: Lord-Lieutenant of Mid Glamorgan
- Term length: One Year

Lord-Lieutenant's Cadet of Mid Glamorgan
- Incumbent; Cdt FS Scott Jones since 30 January 2023
- Abbreviation: LLCofMidGlam
- Appointer: Lord-Lieutenant of Mid Glamorgan
- Term length: One Year

Lord-Lieutenant's Cadet of Mid Glamorgan
- Incumbent; Able Cadet Brandon Jones since 30 January 2023
- Abbreviation: LLCofMidGlam
- Appointer: Lord-Lieutenant of Mid Glamorgan
- Term length: One Year

Lord-Lieutenant's Cadet of Mid Glamorgan
- Incumbent; Able Cadet Anna-Maria Petter since 30 January 2023
- Abbreviation: LLCofMidGlam
- Appointer: Lord-Lieutenant of Mid Glamorgan
- Term length: One Year

Lord-Lieutenant's Cadet of Mid Glamorgan
- Incumbent; Cadet Corporal Casey Garland since 30 January 2023
- Abbreviation: LLCofMidGlam
- Appointer: Lord-Lieutenant of Mid Glamorgan
- Term length: One Year

== Midlothian ==
Lord-Lieutenant's Cadet of Midlothian
- Incumbent; Cdt Sgt Max Loraine since 2025
- Abbreviation: LLCofMACF
- Appointer: Lord-Lieutenant of Midlothian
- Term length: One Year

== Oxfordshire ==
Lord-Lieutenant's Cadet of Oxfordshire
- Incumbent; CWO Samuel Turner since 2022
- Abbreviation: LLCofBOXF
- Appointer: Lord-Lieutenant of Oxfordshire
- Term length: One Year
- Website: Oxfordshire Lieutenancy

== Rutland ==
Lord-Lieutenant's Cadets of Rutland are nominated by their local units and appointed by the Lord-Lieutenant in an Investiture Ceremony usually around early October every year. The current Lord-Lieutenant's Cadets assumed position on May 2026 and will hold their position until May 2027.

Lord-Lieutenant's Cadet of Rutland
- Incumbent; Cdt Rsm. Eli Birch since 2026
- Abbreviation: LLCofANG
- Member of: Uppingham School
- Appointer: Lord-Lieutenant of Rutland
- Term length: One Year

Lord-Lieutenant's Cadet of Rutland
- Incumbent; Cdt Sgt Freddie Green since 19 September 2024
- Abbreviation: LLCofRATC
- Appointer: Lord-Lieutenant of Rutland
- Term length: One Year

== South Glamorgan ==
Lord-Lieutenant's Cadet of South Glamorgan
- Incumbent; Cdt FS Kevin Titus since 2 March 2023
- Abbreviation: LLCofSouthGlam
- Appointer: Lord-Lieutenant of South Glamorgan
- Term length: One Year

Lord-Lieutenant's Cadet of South Glamorgan
- Incumbent; Able Cadet Sean Edwards since 2 March 2023
- Abbreviation: LLCofSouthGlam
- Appointer: Lord-Lieutenant of South Glamorgan
- Term length: One Year

== Suffolk ==
Lord-Lieutenant's Cadet
- Incumbent; Cadet Flight Sergeant Emily Byworth since 2025
- Abbreviation: LLCofSATC
- Appointer: Lord-Lieutenant of Suffolk
- Term length: One Year

Lord-Lieutenant's Cadet of Suffolk ACF
- Incumbent; Cadet Staff Sergeant Andrew West since 2025
- Abbreviation: LLCofSACF
- Appointer: Lord-Lieutenant of Suffolk
- Term length: One Year
- Succession: Cdt RSM J West
