= Shane Alexander, 2nd Earl Alexander of Tunis =

British hereditary peer (born 1935)

The Right Honourable The Earl Alexander of Tunis

Member of the House of Lords
- Lord Temporal
- In office 16 June 1969 – 11 November 1999
- Preceded by: The 1st Earl Alexander of Tunis
- Succeeded by: Seat abolished (Note: Under the House of Lords Act 1999.)

Personal details
- Born: Shane William Desmond Alexander; 30 June 1935 (age 91)
- Spouses: Hilary Van Geest (m. 1971; div. 1976); Davina Mary Woodhouse (m. 1981)
- Parents: Harold Alexander, 1st Earl Alexander of Tunis; Lady Margaret Bingham

Shane William Desmond Alexander, 2nd Earl Alexander of Tunis (born 30 June 1935), styled Lord Rideau between 1952 and 1969, is a British hereditary peer.

He was a member of the House of Lords from 1969 until 1999.

== Biography ==
Alexander is the elder son of Field Marshal Harold Alexander, 1st Earl Alexander of Tunis, and his wife, Lady Margaret Bingham (1905–1977), daughter of George Bingham, 5th Earl of Lucan. He was educated at Harrow School, Ashbury College in Canada (while his father was Governor-General), and the Mons Officer Cadet School. On 14 August 1954, he was commissioned as a second lieutenant into the Irish Guards. On 16 June 1969, he succeeded his father in the earldom, following his death.

Alexander served as a Lord-in-waiting from 8 January 1974 until 4 March 1974, at the end of Edward Heath's premiership. He was also a director of the Pathfinder Financial Corporation (firm dissolved 1988) in Toronto in 1980.

He was a member of the House of Lords from 1969 until the House of Lords Act 1999 came into force in November of that year.

As a male line descendant of the Earls of Caledon, he is also in the remainder to that title and was the heir presumptive from 1980 to 1990.

== Marriages and children ==
Alexander married firstly Hilary van Geest on 14 July 1971. They were divorced in 1976 without having had any children.

He married secondly The Honourable Davinia Mary Woodhouse, daughter of David Woodhouse, 4th Baron Terrington, on 22 July 1981. She is a former lady-in-waiting to Princess Margaret, Countess of Snowdon. They have two daughters:

- Lady Rose Margaret Alexander (born 23 April 1982), a god-daughter of Princess Margaret, who married James Hardinge Houssemayne Du Boulay on 6 February 2015 and has issue;
- Lady Lucy Caroline Alexander (born 1984), who married James Agar, 7th Earl of Normanton, in June 2012 and has issue.

As Alexander has no son, the heir presumptive to the earldom is his younger brother, the Honourable Brian James Alexander, CMG (born 1939). He is the last person in line to succeed to the earldom and subsidiary titles.

== Arms ==
Coat of arms of Shane Alexander, 2nd Earl Alexander of Tunis
Crest An arm in armour, embowed, the hand holding a sword proper, hilt and pommel or. Escutcheon Per pale argent and sable, a chevron, and in base a crescent, all counterchanged; on a canton azure a harp or stringed argent. Supporters Dexter, A piper of the Irish Guards holding under the interior arm a bagpipe; Sinister, A sepoy of the 3rd/2nd Punjabi Regiment supporting with the exterior arm a rifle proper; Each charged on the shoulder with an escutcheon barry nebuly of six argent and azure. Motto “Per mare, per terre, per astra” (By sea, by land, by the stars).

== Notes ==
Peerage of the United Kingdom
Preceded by Harold Alexander	Earl Alexander of Tunis; 1969–present Member of the House of Lords (1969–1999)	Incumbent; Heir presumptive: Hon. Brian Alexander
Preceded by Harold Alexander	Viscount Alexander of Tunis; 1969–present	Incumbent; Heir presumptive: Hon. Brian Alexander
Preceded by Harold Alexander	Baron Rideau; 1969–present	Incumbent; Heir presumptive: Hon. Brian Alexander
