= Harold Alexander, 1st Earl Alexander of Tunis =

British field marshal; Governor General of Canada (1891–1969)

Field Marshal The Right Honourable The Earl Alexander of Tunis KG GCB OM GCMG CSI DSO MC CD PC PC (Can)
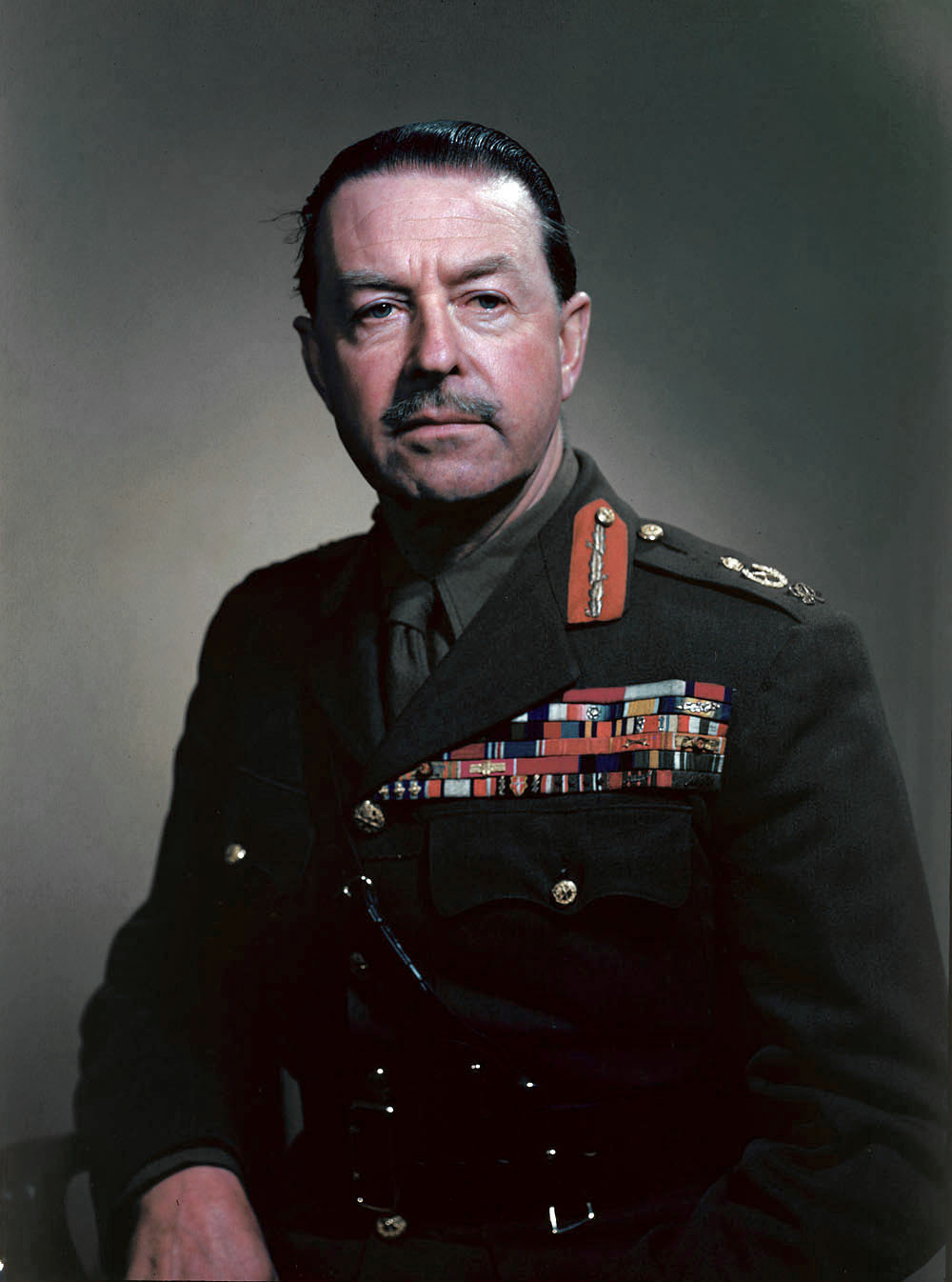
- Alexander in 1944

17th Governor General of Canada
- In office 12 April 1946 – 28 January 1952
- Monarch: George VI
- Prime Minister: William Lyon Mackenzie King; Louis St. Laurent
- Preceded by: The Earl of Athlone
- Succeeded by: Vincent Massey

Minister of Defence
- In office 1 March 1952 – 18 October 1954
- Prime Minister: Winston Churchill
- Preceded by: Winston Churchill
- Succeeded by: Harold Macmillan

Lord Lieutenant of the County of London
- In office 25 April 1957 – 1 April 1965
- Monarch: Elizabeth II
- Preceded by: Alan Brooke
- Succeeded by: Himself (as Lord-Lieutenant of Greater London)

Lord-Lieutenant of Greater London
- In office 1 April 1965 – 28 December 1966
- Monarch: Elizabeth II
- Preceded by: Himself (as Lord Lieutenant of the County of London)
- Succeeded by: Gerald Templer

Member of the House of Lords
- Lord Temporal
- In office 1 March 1946 – 16 June 1969
- Preceded by: Peerage created
- Succeeded by: 2nd Earl Alexander of Tunis

Personal details
- Born: Harold Rupert Leofric George Alexander; 10 December 1891 London, England
- Died: 16 June 1969 (aged 77) Slough, Buckinghamshire, England
- Resting place: Churchyard of Ridge, near Tyttenhanger
- Spouse: Margaret Alexander, Countess Alexander of Tunis (m. 1931)
- Children: Lady Rose Maureen Alexander; Shane, 2nd Earl; The Hon. Brian James Alexander
- Education: Harrow School; Royal Military College, Sandhurst
- Profession: Soldier
- Nicknames: "Alex"; "The Soldier's Soldier"

Military service
- Allegiance: United Kingdom
- Branch/service: British Army
- Years of service: 1910–1946
- Rank: Field Marshal
- Unit: Irish Guards
- Commands: Supreme Commander Allied Forces Headquarters; 15th Army Group; 18th Army Group; Middle East Command; Southern Command; I Corps; 1st Infantry Division; Nowshera Brigade; 1st Battalion, Irish Guards; 2nd Battalion, Irish Guards; Baltische Landeswehr
- Battles/wars: First World War; Latvian War of Independence; Second Mohmand Campaign; Second World War
- Awards: See below
- Service No.: 17884

Harold Alexander; 1st Earl Alexander of Tunis
- Earl Alexander of Tunis
- Arms of Earl Alexander of Tunis
- Tenure: 14 March 1952 – 16 June 1969
- Successor: Shane Alexander, 2nd Earl
- Other titles: 1st Viscount Alexander of Tunis; 1st Baron Rideau
- Parents: The 4th Earl of Caledon; Lady Elizabeth Graham-Toler

Field Marshal Harold Rupert Leofric George Alexander, 1st Earl Alexander of Tunis (10 December 1891 – 16 June 1969) was a British Army officer who served in both of the world wars. Alexander was born in London and was educated at Harrow school before moving on to the Royal Military College, Sandhurst, for training as an army officer of the Irish Guards. He rose to military prominence through his service in the First World War, and continued his career through various British campaigns across Europe and Asia during the interwar period.

In the Second World War, Alexander, initially in command of a division, oversaw the final stages of the Allied evacuation from Dunkirk and subsequently held field commands in Britain, Burma, North Africa and Italy, including serving as Commander-in-Chief Middle East and commanding the 18th Army Group in Tunisia. He then commanded the 15th Army Group for the capture of Sicily and again in Italy before being promoted to field marshal and being made Supreme Allied Commander Mediterranean in late 1944.

In 1946, after being created Viscount Alexander of Tunis, he was appointed as Governor General of Canada by King George VI, on the recommendation of the Prime Minister of Canada, William Lyon Mackenzie King, to replace the Earl of Athlone as viceroy. In 1952, he was elevated in the British peerage, becoming Earl Alexander of Tunis, and was succeeded by Vincent Massey as Governor General of Canada. Alexander proved to be enthusiastic about the Canadian wilderness and popular with Canadians. He was the last Governor General who was born in the United Kingdom as well as the last Governor General to be a peer.

After the end of his viceregal tenure, Alexander was sworn into the Queen's Privy Council for Canada and thereafter, in order to serve as the British Minister of Defence in the Cabinet of Winston Churchill, into the Imperial Privy Council. Alexander retired in 1954 and died in 1969.

== Early life and military career ==
Alexander was born in London into an aristocratic family from County Tyrone of Anglo-Irish descent. He was the third son of James Alexander, 4th Earl of Caledon, and Lady Elizabeth Graham-Toler, Countess of Caledon, a daughter of the 3rd Earl of Norbury. Alexander was educated at Hawtreys and Harrow School, there participating as the 11th batsman in the sensational Fowler's Match against Eton College in 1910. Though Alexander toyed with the notion of becoming an artist, he went instead on to the Royal Military College, Sandhurst, in 1910.

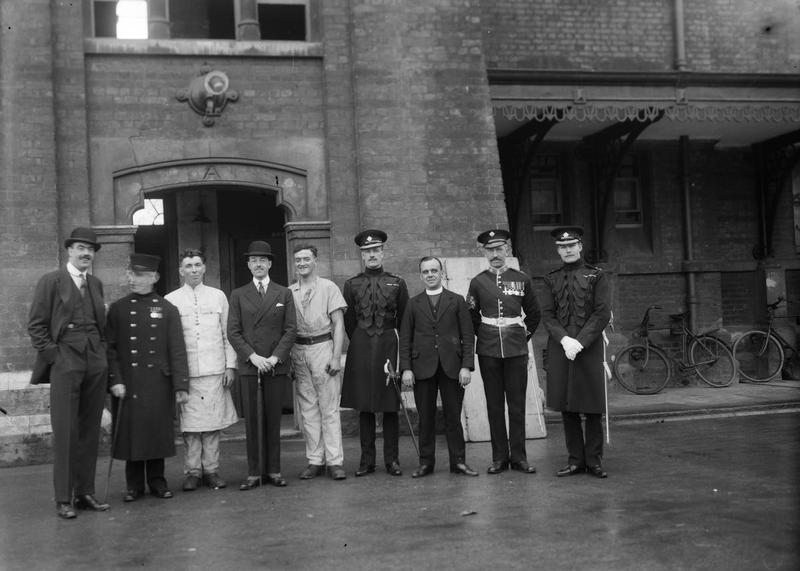
Members of the Irish Guards, pictured here sometime before 1914. Alexander, wearing civilian clothes, is standing fourth on the left.

After passing out from Sandhurst, where he was, apparently, "not an outstanding cadet" despite excelling at athletics and winning the Irish Mile championship, he was commissioned as a second lieutenant in the Irish Guards, "with whom he would have a lifelong association", on 23 September 1911. He was promoted to lieutenant on 5 December 1912.

== First World War ==
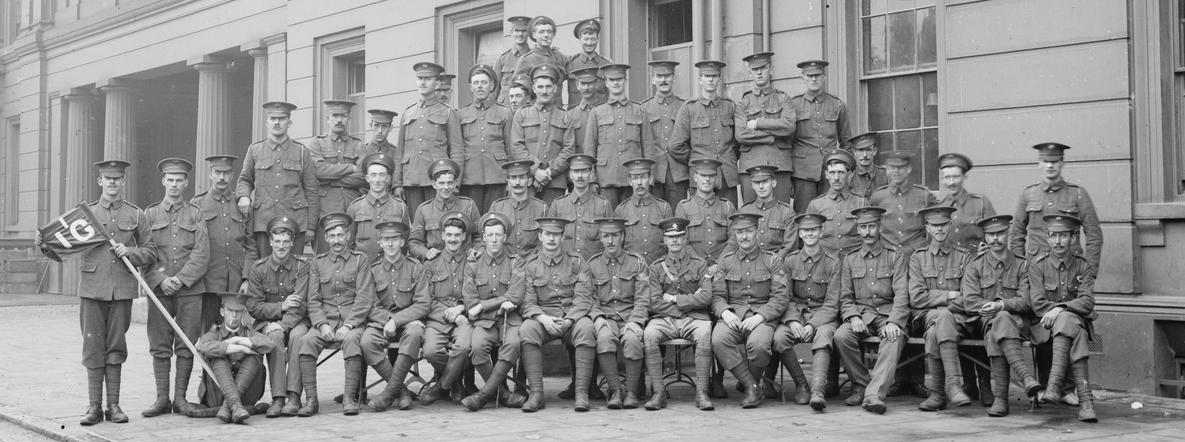
A platoon of the 1st Battalion, Irish Guards, pictured here upon the outbreak of the First World War, August 1914. Lieutenant Alexander is seated seventh from the right, with his arms folded and wearing a peaked cap.

Alexander spent most of the First World War on the Western Front. As a 22-year-old platoon commander in the 1st Battalion, Irish Guards, he served with the British Expeditionary Force (BEF) in 1914. He took part in the retreat from Mons and was wounded at First Ypres and invalided home. He was promoted to temporary captain on 15 November 1914 and permanent captain in the newly raised 2nd Battalion on 7 February the following year.

Alexander returned to the Western Front in August 1915, fought at the Battle of Loos and was, for ten days in October 1915, an acting major and acting Commanding Officer (CO) of the 1st Battalion, Irish Guards, as a "Battle Casualty Replacement". He then returned to the 2nd Battalion as a company officer and, in January 1916, received the Military Cross for his bravery at Loos. For service in the Battle of the Somme on 15 September 1916, he was, in October, appointed a Companion of the Distinguished Service Order (DSO), the citation for which read:

For conspicuous gallantry in action. He was the life and soul of the attack, and throughout the day led forward not only his own men but men of all regiments. He held the trenches gained in spite of heavy machine gun fire.

In the same month, Alexander was further honoured with induction into the French Légion d'honneur.

On 10 December 1916, his twenty-fifth birthday, Alexander became second-in-command of the 1st Battalion, Irish Guards, as an acting major. By May, he was briefly acting CO of the 1st Battalion, as an acting lieutenant colonel, while still only a substantive captain. He became a permanent major on 1 August 1917, and was again promoted acting lieutenant colonel, this time confirmed as CO of the 2nd Battalion, Irish Guards, on 15 October. Alexander commanded his battalion at Third Ypres, where he was slightly wounded, then at Bourlon Wood (part of the battle of Cambrai), where his battalion suffered 320 casualties out of 400 men. Between 23 and 30 March 1918, Alexander assumed command of the 4th Guards Brigade during the British retreat from the German Army's Spring Offensive. He once again commanded the 2nd Battalion, Irish Guards, at Hazebrouck in April 1918, where it took such severe casualties that it saw no further action. He was appointed to command a corps infantry school in October 1918, a month before the war ended on 11 November 1918.

Rudyard Kipling, who wrote a history of the Irish Guards, in which his own son, Jack Kipling, fought and was killed in action, noted that, "it is undeniable that Colonel Alexander had the gift of handling the men on the lines to which they most readily responded ... His subordinates loved him, even when he fell upon them blisteringly for their shortcomings; and his men were all his own."

== Between the wars ==
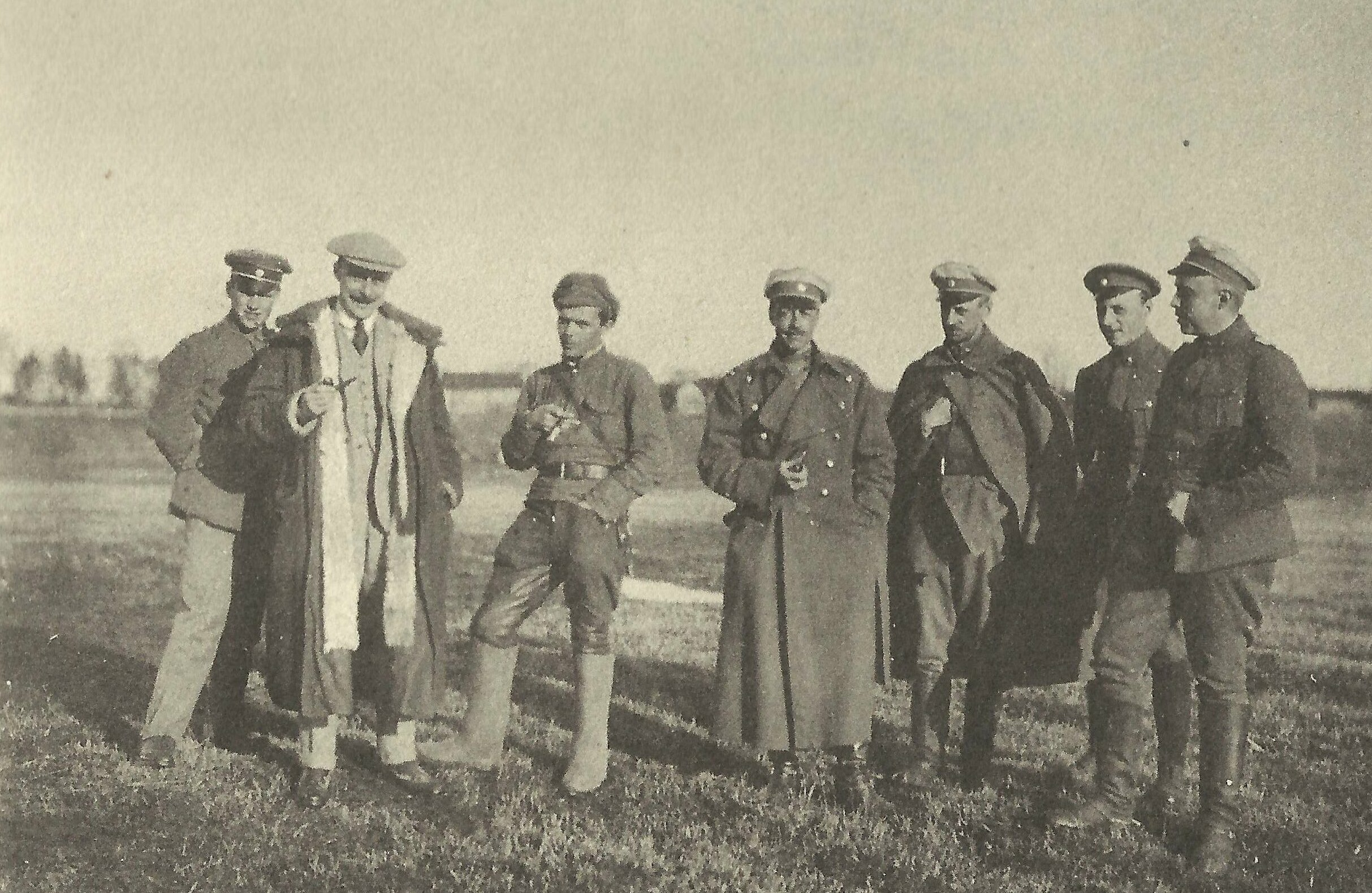
Officers of the Baltic Landeswehr in Latvia 1920 – Alexander is in the middle.

Alexander in 1919 served with the Allied Control Commission in Poland. As a temporary lieutenant-colonel, he led the Baltic German Landeswehr in the Latvian War of Independence, commanding units loyal to Latvia in the successful drive to eject the Bolsheviks from Latgalia. During service there, he was accidentally wounded by one of his own sentries on 9 October 1919.

Alexander returned to Britain in May 1920 as a major, second in command of the 1st Battalion, Irish Guards; in May 1922, he was promoted substantive lieutenant-colonel and appointed commanding officer. He commanded the battalion at Constantinople (a sensitive posting in the runup to the Chanak Crisis), then Gibraltar from October 1922, then in London from April 1923 until January 1926, when he was released from that role to attend the Staff College at Camberley, England, from 1926 to 1927. By now Alexander had gained an excellent reputation for himself. In addition, he was older than many of his fellow students—and even some of his instructors—at the college. Among his many fellow students were Douglas Wimberley, who would later become a major-general and command the 51st (Highland) Division from 1941 to 1943, including at the Second Battle of El Alamein, who formed a high opinion of Alexander, who, despite his outstanding war record, showed little sign of being overly pleased with himself. Instead, he showed "simplicity, directness and kindness" and gained the respect of all at the college, with two notable exceptions—the future field marshals Alan Brooke and Bernard Montgomery—who did not come away with a particularly favourable impression of him.

After graduating from the Staff College, Alexander was then, in February 1928, promoted to colonel (backdated to 14 May 1926) and was the next month appointed Officer Commanding the Irish Guards Regimental District and 140th (4th London) Infantry Brigade, part of the 47th (1/2nd London) Division, in the Territorial Army (TA), a post he held until January 1930, when he again returned to study, attending the Imperial Defence College in London for one year.

Alexander then held staff appointments as (from January 1931) GSO2 in the Directorate of Military Training at the War Office and (1932–1934) GSO1 at HQ Northern Command in York, before being made in October 1934 a temporary brigadier and given command of the Nowshera Brigade, on the Northwest Frontier in India. For his service there, and in particular for his actions in the Loe-Agra operations against the Pathans in Malakand between February and April 1935, Alexander was that year made a Companion of the Order of the Star of India and was mentioned in despatches. He was mentioned once more for his service during the Second Mohmand Campaign in Northwest Frontier Province from August to October of the same year, serving under Brigadier Claude Auchinleck. Alexander had a reputation for leading from the front and for reaching mountain crests with or even ahead of his troops.

In March 1937, Alexander was appointed as one of the aides-de-camp to the recently acceded King George VI and in May returned to the United Kingdom to take part in this capacity in the state procession through London during the King's coronation. Alexander would have been seen in this event by two of his Canadian viceregal successors: Vincent Massey, who was then the Canadian high commissioner to the United Kingdom, and Massey's secretary, Georges Vanier, who watched the procession from the roof of Canada House on Trafalgar Square. Following the coronation celebration, Alexander returned to India, where he was made the honorary colonel of the 3rd Battalion, 2nd Punjab Regiment, and then in October 1937 was promoted to the rank of major-general, making Alexander the youngest general in the British Army. He relinquished command of his brigade in January 1938, and in February returned to the United Kingdom to take command of the 1st Infantry Division. In June 1938 he was appointed a Companion of the Order of the Bath.

== Second World War ==
=== Belgium and France 1939−1940 ===
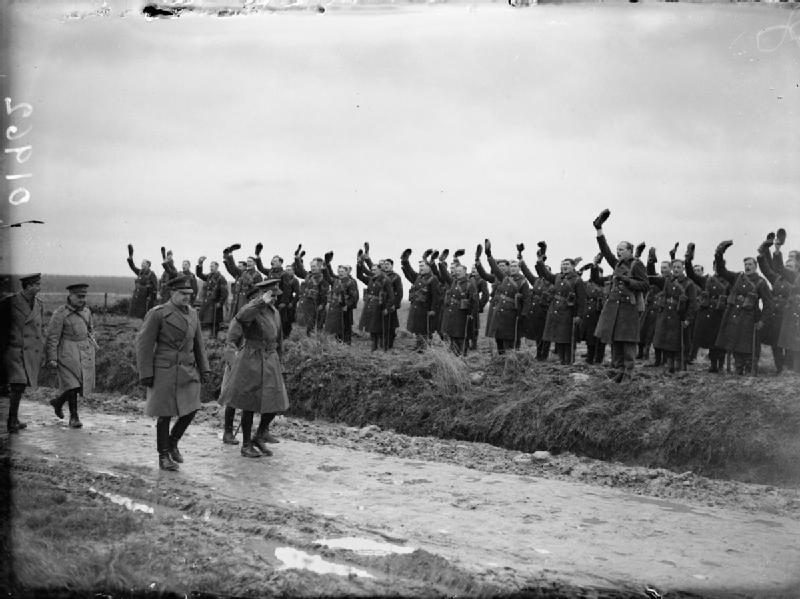
Major-General The Hon. Harold Alexander with King George VI inspecting men of the 2nd Battalion, Hampshire Regiment, part of the 1st Infantry Brigade (Guards) of Alexander's 1st Division, near Bachy, France, December 1939.

Following the outbreak of the Second World War, in September 1939, Alexander brought the 1st Division to France, where it became part of the British Expeditionary Force (BEF) and served there for the next eight months, serving mainly under I Corps of the BEF under General Sir John Dill. While waiting for a German attack, Alexander trained his division "to the highest standards", maintaining "a strict training programme", which led to be "ruthless when necessary", dismissing one of his battalion commanders for "not taking his job seriously enough".

On 10 May 1940, when the German Army invaded France, Alexander successfully led the division's advance into Belgium. Soon, however, the BEF and the French Army began to retreat, as the Belgian Army started to collapse "and French morale started crumbling". Despite the chaotic retreat, the 1st Division and its GOC, Alexander, "performed coolly".

The division then began to withdraw to Dunkirk, where it was evacuated to England, along with the rest of the BEF. Shortly after Major General Bernard Montgomery had been appointed to command II Corps (and before that the 3rd Division), Alexander was, while still on the Dunkirk beachhead, placed in command of I Corps, and left the eastern mole on the destroyer Venomous late on 2 June after ensuring that all British troops had been evacuated.

In recognition of his services in the field from March to June 1940, Alexander was again mentioned in despatches.

=== United Kingdom 1940−1942 ===
After Dunkirk, Alexander returned to the United Kingdom and continued to command I Corps, now guarding the coasts of Yorkshire and Lincolnshire as part of Northern Command. He was promoted acting lieutenant-general in July 1940, and in December 1940 he was appointed to succeed Claude Auchinleck as General Officer Commanding-in-Chief (GOC-in-C) of Southern Command, which was responsible for the defence of south-west England. His rank of lieutenant-general was made permanent in December 1940. While he was here he came into contact with Lieutenant-General Bernard Montgomery, who was then serving under his command as GOC of V Corps. Montgomery and Auchinleck had never seen eye-to-eye on much but Alexander, believing Montgomery, who had been one of Alexander's instructors at the Staff College in the mid-1920s, knew what he was doing, simply allowed Montgomery (or "Monty") to continue with what he was doing. The two men got along well and their relationship would continue in a similar manner later on in the war.

It was during this period and most of 1941 where Alexander came to the attention of his superiors, the most notable among them being General Sir Alan Brooke, then the Commander-in-Chief, Home Forces (and in December 1941 succeeding John Dill as Chief of the Imperial General Staff), and Winston Churchill, the Prime Minister. Churchill in particular became a great admirer of Alexander and visited him numerous times throughout 1941, nominating him as the commander of Force 110. Created on paper as the first expeditionary force since the BEF's evacuation from France the year before, Force 110 was considered for several projects throughout the year of 1941, such as landings in the Azores, the Canary Islands and Sicily, but these were, perhaps fortunately, all ultimately abandoned.

=== Burma and India 1942 ===
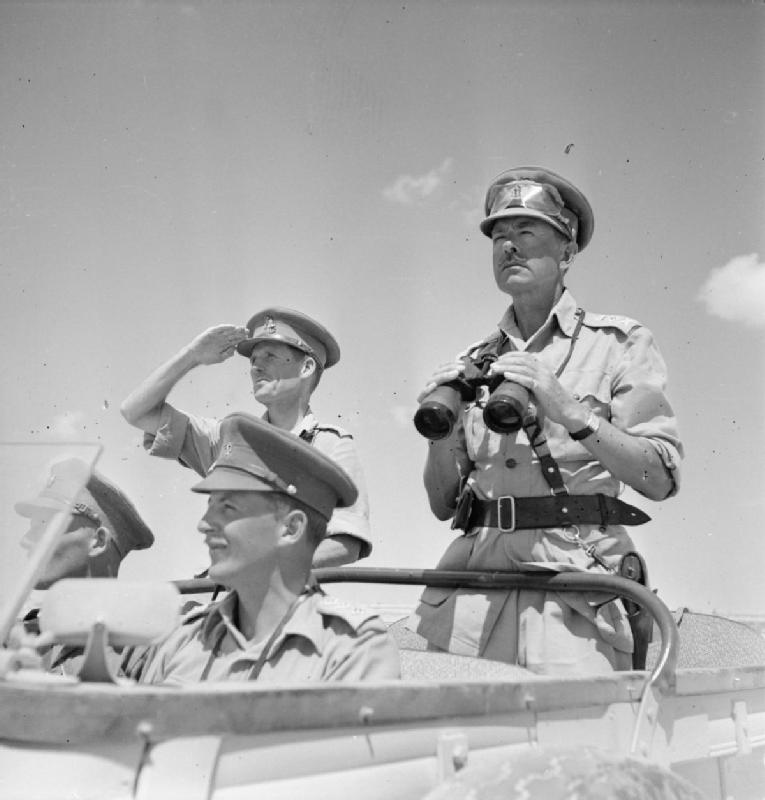
General Sir Harold Alexander, pictured here in August 1942 as Commander-in-Chief, Middle East, surveys the battlefront from an open car. To his right is Major-General John Harding.

On 1 January 1942 he was knighted and appointed a Knight Commander of the Order of the Bath, and in February, after the Japanese invasion of Burma, was sent to India to become GOC-in-C of British Forces in Burma as a full general. Alexander was unable to fulfil his orders to hold Rangoon, which was abandoned on 6–7 March. He took personal charge of some small local engagements, and was encircled by the Japanese troops in the Battle of Yenangyaung. Rescued by Chinese troops commanded by General Sun Li-jen, Alexander was able to escape. Following that, Alexander increasingly left much of the tactical conduct of the campaign to his corps commander, Lieutenant-General William Slim, while he himself handled the more political aspects of relations with Joseph Stilwell, the nominal commander of the Chinese forces. Alexander was promoted to Commander-in-Chief (C-in-C) of Allied Land Forces in Burma, March 1942, and ordered Slim to abandon Mandalay and retreat to India.

=== The Middle East and North Africa 1942−1943 ===
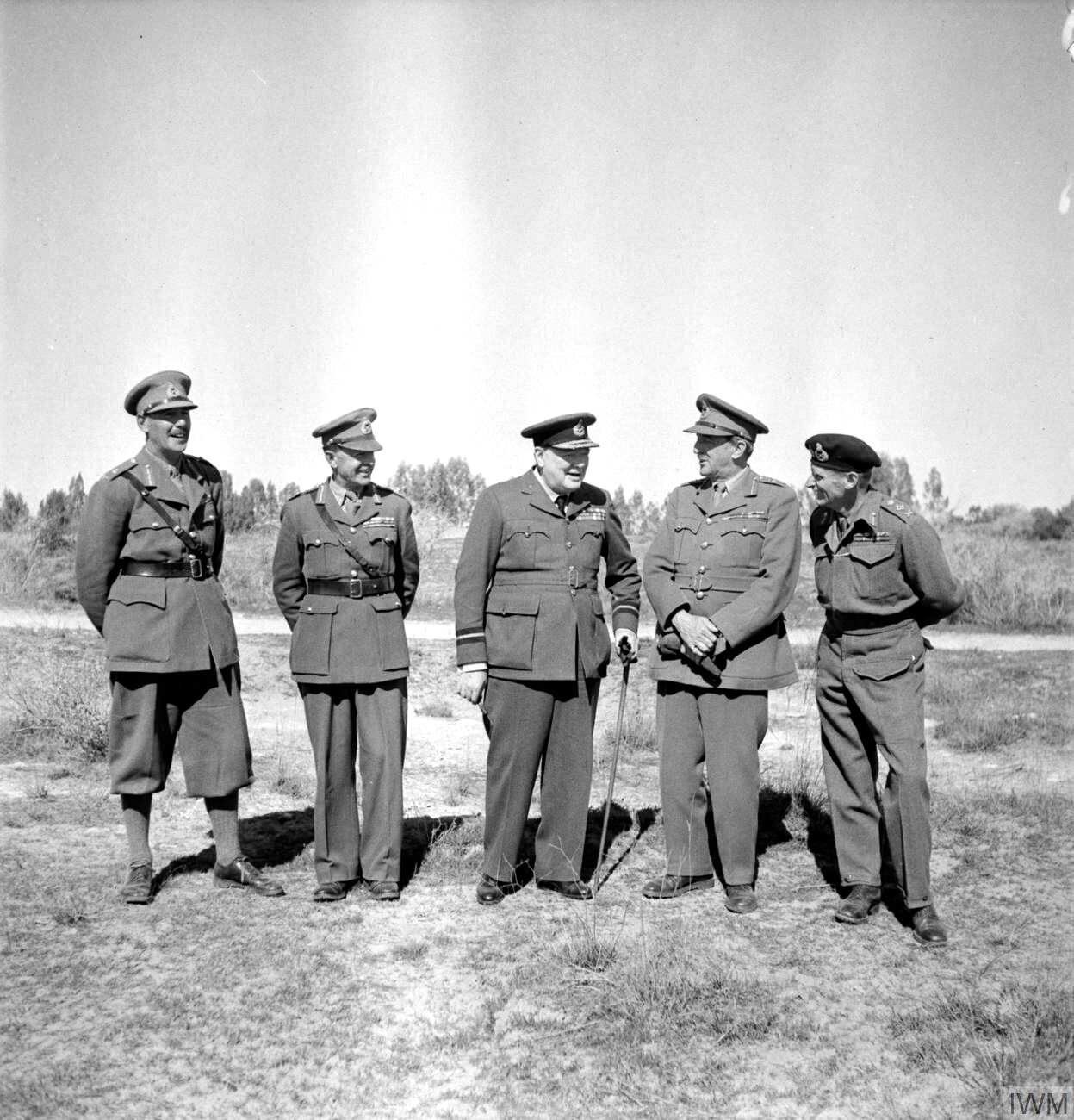
The Prime Minister, Winston Churchill, with military leaders during his visit to Tripoli in February 1943. The group includes: Lieutenant-General Sir Oliver Leese, General Sir Harold Alexander, General Sir Alan Brooke and General Sir Bernard Montgomery.

By July 1942, the British and Indian forces in Burma had completed their fighting retreat into India, and Alexander, having yet again been mentioned in despatches for his Burma service, was recalled to the United Kingdom. He was at first selected to command the British First Army, which was to take part in Operation Torch, the Anglo-American invasion of French North Africa. However, following a visit in early August to Egypt by the British Prime Minister, Winston Churchill, and the Chief of the Imperial General Staff (CIGS), General Sir Alan Brooke, Alexander flew to Cairo on 8 August to replace General Claude Auchinleck, Alexander's predecessor at Southern Command in the United Kingdom, as C-in-C of Middle East Command, the post responsible for the overall conduct of the campaign in the desert of North Africa. At the same time, Lieutenant-General Montgomery replaced Auchinleck as GOC of the British Eighth Army. Alexander presided over Montgomery's victory at the Second Battle of El Alamein and the advance of the Eighth Army to Tripoli, for which Alexander was elevated to a Knight Grand Cross of the Order of the Bath, and, after the Anglo-American forces of the First Army (under Lieutenant-General Kenneth Anderson) from Operation Torch and the Eighth Army converged in Tunisia in February 1943, they were brought under the unified command of a newly formed 18th Army Group headquarters, commanded by Alexander and reporting to General Dwight D. Eisenhower, the Supreme Allied Commander in the Mediterranean theatre at Allied Forces Headquarters (AFHQ). The American General Omar Bradley, who fought in the Tunisian campaign, then commanding the U.S. II Corps, credited Alexander's patience and experience with helping an inexperienced United States "field command mature and eventually come of age".

The Axis forces in Tunisia surrendered by May 1943, with some 250,000 Axis troops surrendering, the largest surrender yet in the war. Alexander telegraphed Churchill in response, stating:

Sir, it is my duty to report that the Tunisian campaign is over. All enemy resistance has ceased. We are masters of the North African shores.

=== Sicily and Italy 1943−1945 ===
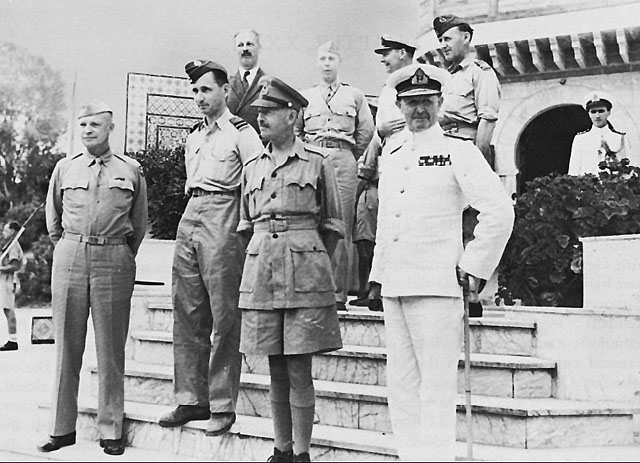
Allied leaders of the Sicilian campaign in North Africa; (front row, left to right) General Dwight D. Eisenhower, Air Chief Marshal Sir Arthur Tedder, General Sir Harold Alexander, Admiral Sir Andrew Cunningham, (top row, left to right) Harold Macmillan, Major General Walter Bedell Smith and unidentified British officers.

After the Tunisian campaign, Alexander's command became the 15th Army Group, which became responsible (under General Eisenhower) for mounting the July 1943 Allied invasion of Sicily (codenamed Operation Husky). Once again, Alexander directed two field armies, both commanded by strong-willed characters who were not easy to control: General Montgomery's British Eighth Army and Lieutenant General George S. Patton's U.S. Seventh Army. The campaign did not portray Alexander at his best and he failed to grip his two commanders. Montgomery's Eighth Army found itself in a slogging match against typically skilful German opposition on the Catanian plain and on the slopes of Mount Etna. Patton, resentful in his belief that he and his Seventh Army had been given a secondary role in the campaign, confronted Alexander and successfully argued for his army to be allowed to drive to the northwest and to capture Palermo. Although initially reluctant to allow Patton such a role, Alexander eventually, but reluctantly, allowed the Seventh Army commander to have his way, although Palermo did not appear to have much strategic significance. Despite this, it turned out to be the key to unlocking the Axis forces' defences and gave the Americans an easier route towards Messina. The brief campaign in Sicily proved largely successful, but some (with Montgomery among the loudest of the critics) believed that the campaign lacked direction – and blamed Alexander. Furthermore, although the Axis forces had been forced to withdraw from Sicily, they had managed to do so in relatively good order, crossing the Straits of Messina into Italy.

After Sicily, planning began for the Allied invasion of Italy, which began on 3 September 1943 (the fourth anniversary of Britain's entry into the war). Montgomery's Eighth Army launched Operation Baytown, crossing over into Calabria but initially facing little real opposition and slowly making its way up the Italian peninsula. Six days later the U.S. Fifth Army (which, despite its name, included the British X Corps under Lieutenant-General Richard McCreery, under its command) under Lieutenant General Mark W. Clark landed at Salerno as part of Operation Avalanche, which, initially at least, started off well, before encountering heavy resistance and almost being thrown back into the sea. He supported McCreery when he refused to consider evacuation plans that Clark had been considering. Alexander was also instrumental in convincing Clark to replace the U.S. VI Corps commander, Major General Ernest J. Dawley – who had not performed well and whom Alexander described as "a broken reed" – with Major General John P. Lucas. Despite the heavy casualties sustained at Salerno, the Allies managed to force the Axis forces back and, with both the Fifth and Eighth Armies now united at last, began pursuing the retreating enemy. By December 1943 progress had virtually ground to a halt as the Axis had Alexander's 15th Army Group held up at the Winter Line (also known as the Gustav Line) and ground was gained only at the expense of heavy casualties. At around this time there were numerous Allied command changes, with Montgomery handing over the Eighth Army to Lieutenant-General Sir Oliver Leese and departing for the United Kingdom to take up command of the 21st Army Group, which controlled all Allied land forces for the planned invasion of Normandy, whilst General Sir Henry Wilson replaced Eisenhower as the Supreme Allied Commander in the Mediterranean in January 1944.

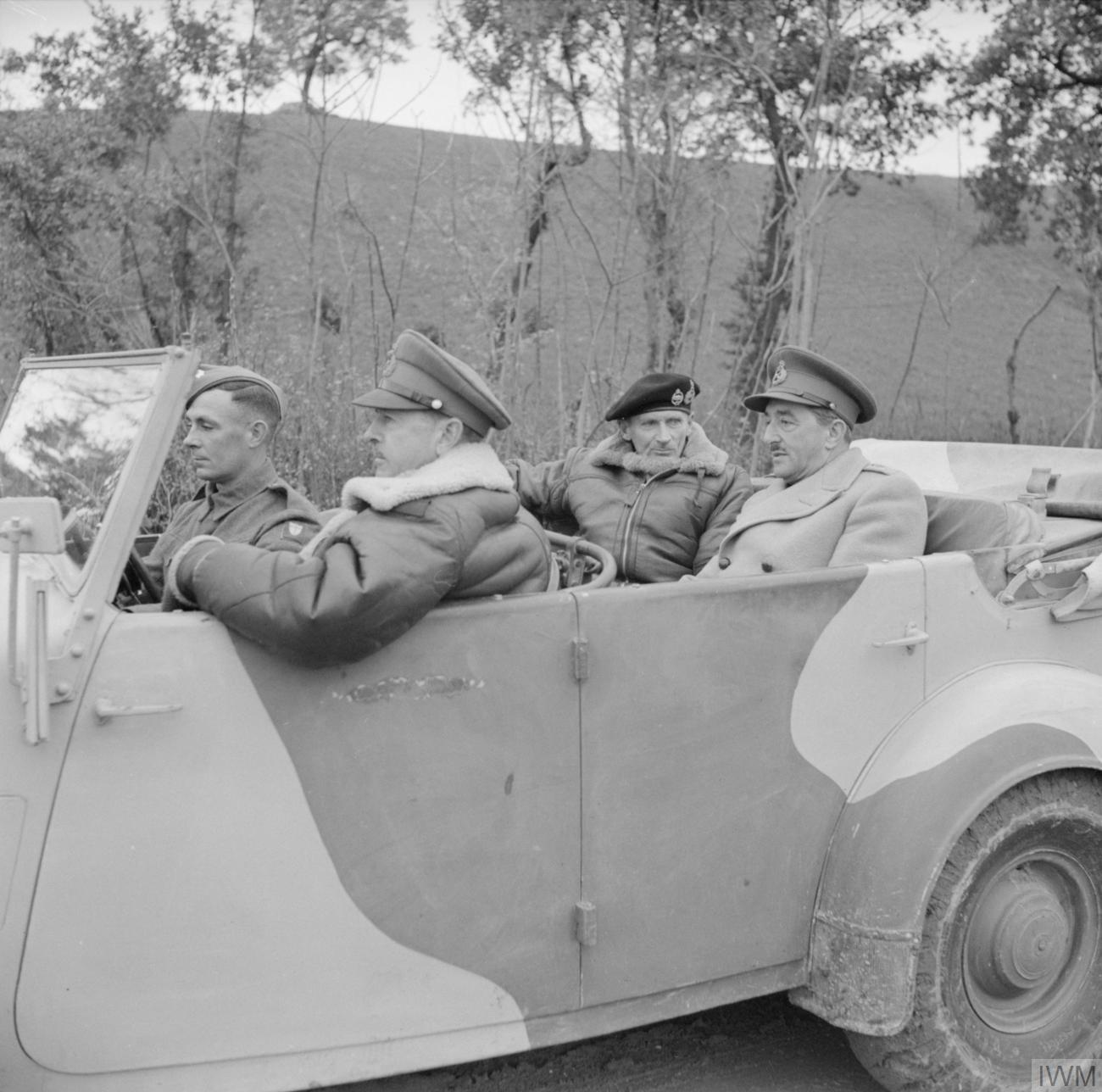
General Sir Bernard Montgomery in his staff car with General Sir Harold Alexander and General Sir Alan Brooke, during an inspection of the 8th Indian Infantry Division HQ, Italy, 15 December 1943

The fighting in Italy would continue to prove even more difficult for Alexander's forces over the following few months. Between January and May 1944, numerous Allied attacks were repulsed at Monte Cassino (which was also bombed in February 1944, with Alexander taking responsibility for the decision to bomb it) and the Anzio landings of January 1944 by Lucas's U.S. VI Corps began well but did not live up to expectations and eventually ended up in a stalemate, like the rest of the Italian fighting so far. Alexander had a large part in planning the landings (code-named "Operation Shingle"), and intended to draw German strength away from the Winter Line and to cut their lines of communication. The scheme was supported by Prime Minister Churchill, who had very high expectations for Shingle. However, the operation was flawed in many ways. In particular, Alexander's plan of seizing the Alban Hills might possibly have led to the entire Allied force (comprising only two infantry divisions, elements of the U.S. 1st Armored Division, and other smaller units in support) being wiped out. Despite Churchill's and Alexander's intentions, the Allied forces at Anzio did not achieve the somewhat unrealistic expectations, and were essentially cut off from any support, although they did manage to lure German reserves from elsewhere, which might otherwise have been available for service on the Eastern Front or during the impending Allied invasion of Normandy.

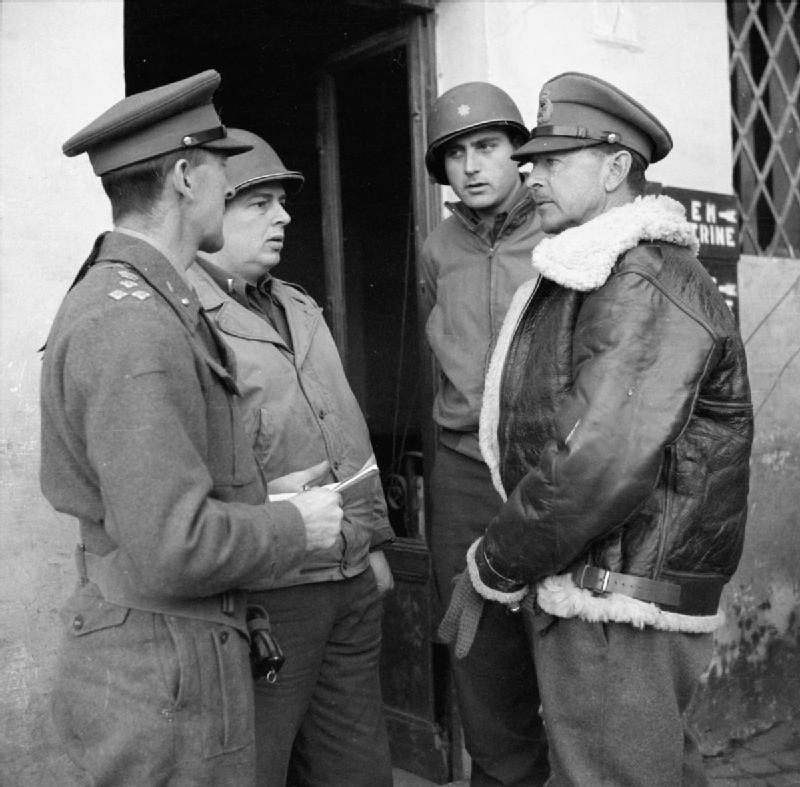
General Sir Harold Alexander, commanding the 15th Army Group, talks to British and American officers at Anzio, Italy, 14 February 1944.

When Eisenhower was appointed in December 1943 as Supreme Allied Commander for the planned Normandy landings, he suggested that Alexander become ground-forces commander, as he was popular with both British and American officers. Omar Bradley (who had commanded U.S. II Corps in Sicily, and later the U.S. First Army and then the U.S. 12th Army Group) remarked that he would have preferred to work with Alexander rather than Montgomery, as he regarded the former as "a restrained, self-effacive and punctilious soldier". Of the problems that subsequently surfaced with Montgomery's command of the Anglo-Canadian 21st Army Group, Bradley suspected they would not have occurred with Alexander in command. Brooke, however, applied pressure to keep Alexander in Italy, considering him unfit for the assignment in France. Thus Alexander remained in command of the 15th Army Group, and, with the support of numerous Allied commanders, controversially authorised the bombing of the historic abbey at Monte Cassino (February 1944), which resulted in little advance on the German Winter Line defences, which had managed to halt the Allied advance in Italy. It was not until the fourth attempt that the Winter Line was breached by the Allies, and Alexander's forces moved on to capture Rome in June 1944, thereby achieving one of the strategic goals of the Italian campaign. However, the U.S. VI Corps, now under Major General Lucian Truscott, in the Anzio beachhead, under U.S. Fifth Army commander Clark's orders, failed to follow their original break-out plan that would have trapped the German 10th Army escaping northwards in the aftermath of the Battle of Monte Cassino, instead favouring an early and highly publicised entry into Rome two days before the Allied landings in Normandy. Although Alexander was angry at Clark for deliberately disobeying his specific orders in order to reach Rome first, he chose to say nothing, believing that it would do nothing for the Allied cause if he were to do so.

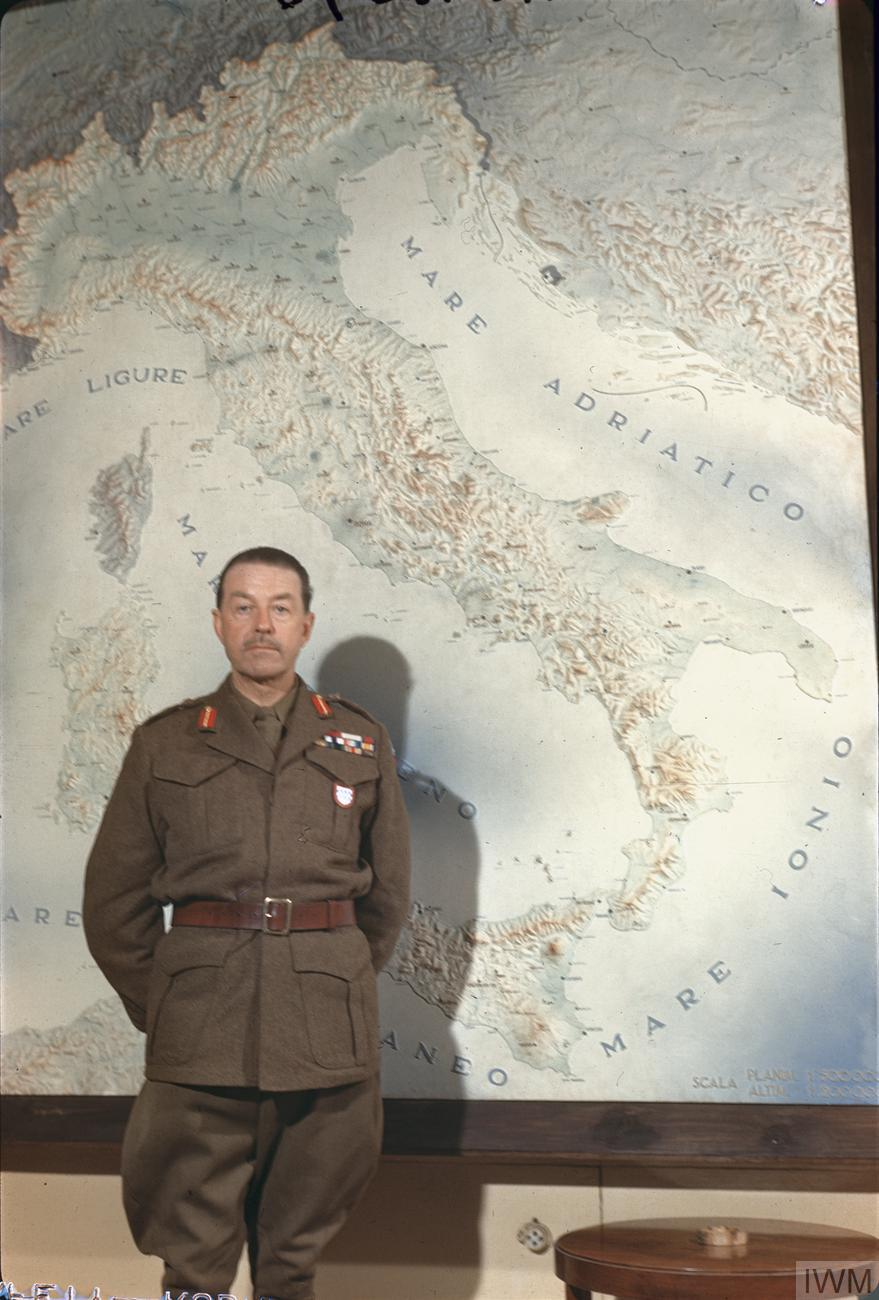
Field Marshal Sir Harold Alexander, pictured here as Supreme Allied Commander of the Mediterranean Forces, at his Headquarters in the Palace of Caserta, Italy

Alexander remained in command of the 15th Army Group, as well as of its successor, the Allied Armies in Italy (AAI), for most of the Italian campaign, until December 1944, when he relinquished his command to Clark and took over as the Supreme Commander of the Allied Forces Headquarters, responsible for all military operations in the Mediterranean theatre. Alexander was concurrently promoted to the rank of field marshal, though this was backdated to the fall of Rome on 4 June 1944, so that Alexander would once again be senior to Montgomery, who had himself been made a field marshal on 1 September 1944, after the end of the Battle of Normandy.

Alexander received the German surrender in Italy on 29 April 1945. As a reward for his leadership in North Africa and Italy, Alexander, along with a number of other prominent British Second World War military leaders, was elevated to the peerage on 1 March 1946 by King George VI; he was created Viscount Alexander of Tunis and of Errigal in the County of Donegal.

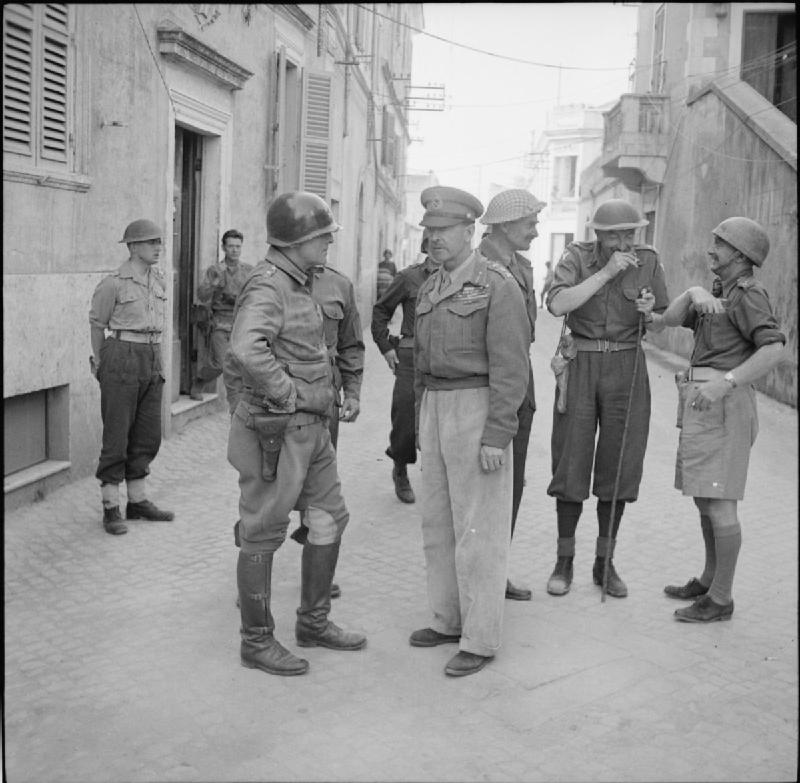
General Sir Harold Alexander with Major General Lucian Truscott and other senior Allied commanders at Anzio, Italy, 5 May 1944. Major-General John Hawkesworth is pictured on the far right wearing a parachutist helmet, and to the left of him is Major-General Philip Gregson-Ellis.

Throughout the war, Alexander would attain a reputation for being empathetic and considerate, and a skilled mediator; however the extent to which he was able to come up with his own ideas versus relying on others would be a matter of debate. One historian would describe him as "Not a great soldier though he was a strategist of some insight", whilst B. H. Liddell Hart would describe him as "though highly intelligent with an open mind...fundamentally a lazy general", stating "he might have been a greater commander if he had not been so nice a man and so deeply a gentleman."

Brooke felt that Alexander needed an able chief of staff "to think for him", while Montgomery (Alexander's subordinate in North Africa, Sicily and Italy) claimed to think of Alexander as "incompetent" and believed that success was attained in Tunisia only because Montgomery lent Lieutenant-General Brian Horrocks, the commander of IX Corps of Anderson's First Army, to organise the coup de grace. However, Harold Macmillan (British Minister Resident in the Mediterranean from 1942 to 1945) was impressed by Alexander's calm and style – the general conducted dinners in his mess like those at an Oxbridge high table, discussing architecture and the campaigns of Belisarius, rather than the current war. Macmillan thought Alexander's urbane manner and willingness to discuss and compromise were a sensible way to maintain inter-Allied cooperation, but Alexander's reserve was such that some thought him empty of strategic ideas and unable to make decisions. (Note: The British diplomat David Hunt, who, during the Second World War, served as an intelligence officer in Greece, North Africa and Italy, and who after the war was a member of the British Committee of Historians of the Second World War, wrote in his war memoirs of Alexander's "brilliant grasp of manoeuvre and deception" and "very sound understanding of the realities of military supply and administration". He also noted that Alexander was, by the almost universal judgement of "men of experience in senior stations", the "foremost British commander of the war". This was, to his personal knowledge, the case with three British prime ministers: Clement Attlee, Winston Churchill and Harold Macmillan. Hunt also quotes Omar Bradley as writing "He not only showed the shrewd tactical judgement that was to make him the outstanding general's general of the European war but was easily able to comport the nationally-minded and jealous Allied personalities of his command. In each successive Mediterranean campaign he had won the adulation of his American subordinates.") Graham and Bidwell, however, wrote that Alexander's impenetrable reserve made it hard to judge whether or not he had any military ideas. They state that he was "unable or unwilling" to assert his will over his army commanders, and that Mark Clark, who often referred to Alexander scornfully as a "peanut" and a "feather duster", exploited this weakness.

== Governor General of Canada ==
With the cessation of hostilities, Alexander was under serious consideration for appointment to the post of Chief of the Imperial General Staff, the British Army's most senior position beneath the sovereign. He was invited, though, by Canadian prime minister William Lyon Mackenzie King to be his recommendation to the King for the post of Governor General of Canada. Alexander thus chose to retire from the army and take up the new position, in anticipation of which he was on 26 January 1946 appointed Knight Grand Cross of the Order of Saint Michael and Saint George and created Viscount Alexander of Tunis, of Errigal in the County of Donegal, on 1 March. On 21 March 1946, the commission under the royal sign-manual and signet appointing Alexander was issued. Alexander was subsequently sworn in during a ceremony in the Senate chamber on 12 April that year.

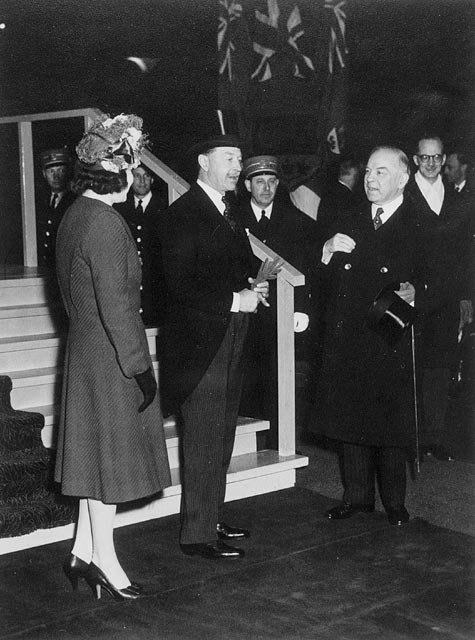
The Viscount and Viscountess Alexander of Tunis are greeted by Prime Minister of Canada Mackenzie King upon the viceregal couple's arrival in Ottawa, 12 April 1946

Alexander took his duties as the viceroy quite seriously, feeling that as governor general, he acted as a connection between Canadians and their King, and spent considerable time travelling Canada during his term; he eventually logged no less than 294,500 km (184,000 mi) during his five years as governor general. On these trips, he sought to engage with Canadians through various ceremonies and events; he was keenly interested in his role as Chief Scout of Canada and, in preparation for his kicking of the opening ball in the 1946 Grey Cup final, practised frequently on the grounds of the royal and viceregal residence, Rideau Hall. Also, in commemoration of Alexander being named the first non-aboriginal chief of the Kwakiutl tribe, he was given a totem pole on 13 July 1946; crafted by Mungo Martin, it remains on the grounds of Rideau Hall today. By the end of the year, Alexander was also distinguished with his induction as a Knight Companion of the Order of the Garter.

In 1947, the King issued letters patent granting his Canadian governor general permission to exercise all those powers belonging to the monarch in respect of Canada and, at the Commonwealth Prime Ministers Conference of 1949, the decision was reached to use the term "member of the Commonwealth" instead of "Dominion" to refer to the non-British member states of the Commonwealth of Nations. That same year, Alexander oversaw the admission of the Newfoundland (a dominion by name but not self-governing) into the Canadian Confederation and toured the new province that summer. Then, during a later visit to Alberta, the Governor General was admitted to the Blackfoot tribe as Chief Eagle Head. However, though the post-war period saw a boom in prosperity for Canada, the country was again at war by 1950, with Alexander, in his role as acting commander-in-chief, deploying to the Korean War soldiers, sailors, and airmen, whom he would visit prior to their departure for north-east Asia. In May 1951, as Commander-in-Chief of Canada, he was deemed a fitting inaugural recipient of the Canadian Forces' Decoration, starting a long tradition of every governor general accepting the CD, usually shortly after their installation as the Sovereign's personal representative in Canada.

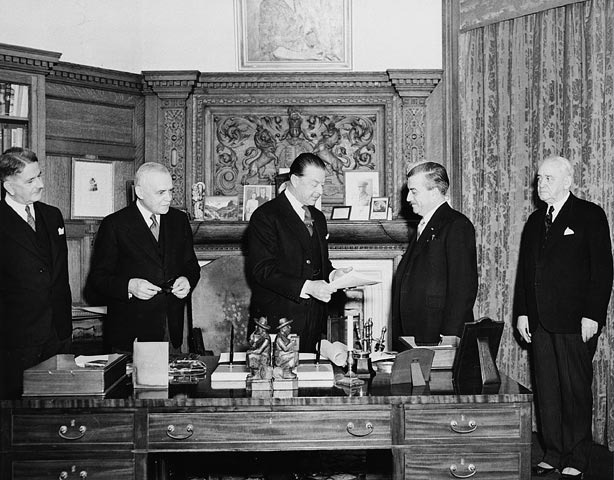
In the Governor General's study at Rideau Hall, Alexander (centre) receives for his signature the bill finalising the union of Newfoundland and Canada, 31 March 1949 (Note: The other figures present are (left to right) Leader of the Government in the Senate Wishart McLea Robertson, Prime Minister Louis St. Laurent, Speaker of the House of Commons Gaspard Fauteux and Speaker of the Senate James Horace King.)

Alexander travelled abroad on official trips—in 1947 visiting US president Harry S. Truman and in June 1948 Brazilian president Eurico Gaspar Dutra—as well as hosting a number of dignitaries. The visit of the Irish Taoiseach, John A. Costello, in 1948 caused Alexander some embarrassment when Costello chose the occasion to announce that the state of Ireland, which controlled most of the Island of Ireland, would become the Republic of Ireland and would therefore leave the Commonwealth (Northern Ireland was not a part of the Irish state, but was rather a constituent part of the United Kingdom, and would thus remain in the Commonwealth). Although the decision had been taken in principle earlier, the sudden announcement caused a diplomatic storm and Costello, to deflect criticism, claimed that he had been provoked into making the announcement by a series of diplomatic snubs by Lord Alexander. In his memoirs, Costello was to admit that Alexander's behaviour had in fact been perfectly civil and could have had no bearing on a decision which had already been made to declare the Republic of Ireland.

The Alexanders' relatively informal lifestyle at Rideau Hall was demonstrated when during the Canadian tour of Princess Elizabeth and her husband, the Duke of Edinburgh, the Viscount and Viscountess hosted a square dance in the palace's ballroom. Alexander painted (creating a personal studio in the former dairy at Rideau Hall and mounting classes in art at the National Gallery of Canada), partook in a number of sports (including golf, ice hockey, and rugby), and enjoyed the outdoors, particularly during Ontario and Quebec's maple syrup harvest, himself overseeing the process on Rideau Hall's grounds. The Viscount was known to escape from official duties to partake in his most favourite pastime of fishing, once departing from the 1951 royal tour of Princess Elizabeth to take in a day's fishing at Griffin Island, in Georgian Bay, and granting a day off for students in the town of Drayton, Ontario, where his train briefly stopped. He presented the Alexander Cup to the Canadian Amateur Hockey Association in November 1950; the cup became the championship trophy of the Major Series of senior ice hockey.

Among Canadians, Alexander proved to be a popular viceroy, despite the calls for a Canadian-born governor general that had preceded his appointment. He not only had a much praised military reputation (he was considered to be the best military strategist since the 1st Duke of Wellington) but also was a charismatic figure, with an easy ability to communicate with people. Others, however, did not fully approve of Alexander; editor Hugh Templin, from Fergus, Ontario, met with Alexander during Templin's time as a special correspondent with the Canadian Press during the Second World War, and he said of the encounter: "Lord Alexander impressed us considerably, if not too favourably. He was an aristocratic type, who didn't like newspaper men."

== British Minister of Defence ==
Lord Alexander gave up the office of Governor General of Canada officially on 28 January 1952 after Churchill asked him to return to London to take the post of Minister of Defence in the British government. The aging Churchill had found it increasingly difficult to cope with holding that portfolio concurrently with that of prime minister, although he still took many major decisions himself, leaving Alexander with little real power. George VI died on the night of 5–6 February and Alexander, in respect of the King's mourning, departed quietly for the United Kingdom, leaving Chief Justice of Canada Thibaudeau Rinfret as administrator of the government in his place. After his return to the UK, Alexander was on 14 March 1952 elevated in the peerage by Queen Elizabeth II, becoming Earl Alexander of Tunis, Baron Rideau of Ottawa and Castle Derg. He was also appointed to the organising committee for the Queen's coronation and was charged with carrying the Sovereign's Orb in the state procession on that occasion in 1953.

== Retirement ==
Alexander served as British defence minister until 1954, when he retired from politics. In 1959 the Queen appointed Alexander to the Order of Merit. From 1960 to 1965, he served as Constable of the Tower of London. Alexander was an active freemason.

Canada remained a favourite second home for the Alexanders and they returned frequently to visit family and friends until Alexander died on 16 June 1969 of a perforated aorta. His funeral was held on 24 June 1969, at St. George's Chapel, in Windsor Castle, and he was buried in St Margaret's churchyard at Ridge, near Tyttenhanger, his family's Hertfordshire home.

== Marriage and children ==
Alexander married Lady Margaret Bingham, daughter of George Bingham, 5th Earl of Lucan, on 14 October 1931. They had three children together and adopted a fourth:

- Lady Rose Maureen Alexander (born 28 October 1932, died 21 August 2017)
- Shane William Desmond Alexander, 2nd Earl Alexander of Tunis (born 30 June 1935)
- Hon. Brian James Alexander, CMG (born 31 July 1939)
- Lady Susan Mary Alexander (born 26 February 1948) (adopted)

== Titles, styles and honours ==
=== Titles and styles ===
- 10 December 1891 – 1 March 1946: The Honourable Harold Alexander
- 1 March 1946 – 16 June 1969: The Right Honourable The Viscount Alexander of Tunis
- 14 March 1952 – 16 June 1969: The Right Honourable The Earl Alexander of Tunis

=== Military Ranks ===
- 23 September 1911: Second Lieutenant, Irish Guards
- 5 December 1912: Lieutenant, Irish Guards
- 15 November 1914: Temporary Captain, Irish Guards
- 7 February 1915: Captain, Irish Guards
- 1 August 1917: Major, Irish Guards
- 14 May 1922: Lieutenant Colonel, Irish Guards
- 14 May 1926: Colonel, 140th (4th London) Infantry Brigade
- 13 October 1934: Brigadier, Nowshera Brigade
- 15 October 1937: Major General, Nowshera Brigade
- 13 July 1938: Lieutenant General
- 17 January 1942: General
- 4 June 1944: Field Marshal

==== Civilian appointments ====
- 12 April 1946 – 28 January 1952: Chief Scout of Canada
- 1950: Chief of the Blackfoot Tribe
- 13 July 1946: Honorary Chief of the Kwakiutl Tribe
- 29 January 1952: Member of the King's Privy Council for Canada (PC (Can))
- 1952: Member of His Majesty's Most Honourable Privy Council (PC)
- 17 May 1957 – 1 April 1965: Lord Lieutenant of the County of London
- 1 April 1965 – 28 December 1966: Lord Lieutenant of Greater London
- 1960–1965: Constable of the Tower of London
- 1945: Freedom of the City of Manchester
- 25 March 1946: Freedom of the City of London
- Freedom of the City of Edinburgh

==== Military appointments ====
- 7 March 1936 – 19 November 1937: Aide-de-Camp to His Majesty the King (ADC)
- 2 July 1937 – 14 August 1947: Colonel of the 3rd Battalion 2nd Punjab Regiment
- 20 July 1944 – 2 August 1946: Aide-de-Camp General to His Majesty the King (ADC General)
- 28 August 1946 – 16 June 1969: Colonel of the Irish Guards
- 10 November 1949 – n/a: Colonel of the Royal Ulster Rifles (London Irish Rifles)
- 10 July 1951: Colonel of the Oxford University Contingent of the University Training Corps

=== Honorary degrees ===
- 22 May 1946: McGill University, Quebec: Doctor of Laws (LLD)
- 1946: Queen's University, Ontario: Doctor of Laws (LLD)
- 1946: University of Toronto, Ontario: Doctor of Laws (LLD)
- 13 May 1948: University of British Columbia: Doctor of Laws (LLD)
- 21 March 1949: University of California Los Angeles: Doctor of Laws (LLD)
- 22 October 1949: University of Western Ontario: Doctor of Laws (LLD)
- 1953: University of Liverpool: Doctor of Laws (LLD)
- 1955: University of Nottingham: Doctor of Laws (LLD)

=== Unofficial ===
(Canada) Alberta

- Chief Eagle Head

=== Honorific eponyms ===
Geographic locations

- Ontario: Viscount Alexander Park, Ottawa

Schools

- Ontario: Viscount Alexander Public School, Ottawa
- Manitoba: École Viscount Alexander, Winnipeg

== Honours, decorations and arms ==
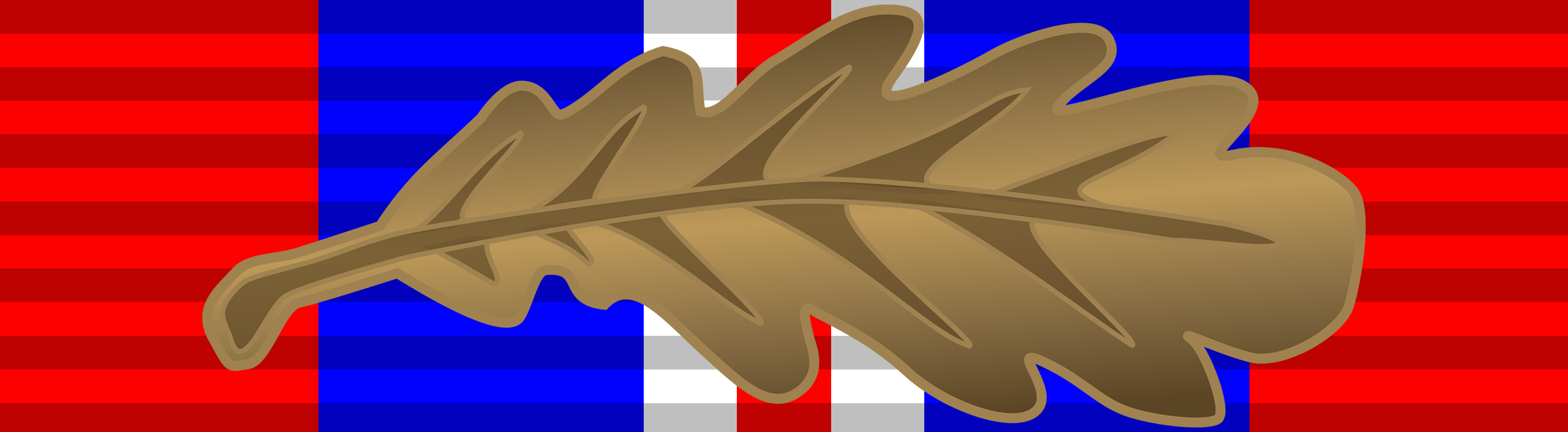
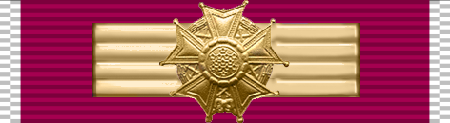

Ribbon	Description	Notes
N/A	Most Noble Order of the Garter	Knight Companion (KG), 3 December 1946
	Most Honourable Order of the Bath	Knight Grand Cross (GCB), 11 November 1942
	Order of Merit	Member (OM), 1 January 1959
	Most Distinguished Order of Saint Michael and Saint George	Grand Master, 1959
	Most Exalted Order of the Star of India	Companion (CSI), 7 February 1936
	Distinguished Service Order	Companion (DSO), 20 October 1916
	Military Cross	Recipient (MC), 14 January 1916
	Most Venerable Order of the Hospital of Saint John of Jerusalem	Knight of Justice (KStJ) (and later appointment as Prior and Chief Officer), 28 January 1952
	1914 Star with bar	1917
	British War Medal	1919
	Victory Medal	Mentioned in Despatches, 1919
	India General Service Medal (1909)	1935
	1939–45 Star	1945
	Burma Star	1945
	Africa Star	With 1st Army Insignia North Africa 1942–1943 Bar
	Italy Star	
	War Medal 1939–1945	Mentioned in Despatches, 1940 and 1942
	King George V Silver Jubilee Medal	1935
	King George VI Coronation Medal	1937
	Queen Elizabeth II Coronation Medal	1953
	Canadian Forces' Decoration (CD)	
	Knight of the Legion of Honour	
	Croix de Guerre with palm	
	Order of St. Anna	Member Second Class with Swords
	Order of Suvorov	Member First Class
	Royal Order of George I	Member Grand Cross
	Order of the Redeemer	Grand Cross
	Order Virtuti Militari	Member Fifth Class
	Legion of Merit	Chief Commander
	Distinguished Service Medal	
	European–African–Middle Eastern Campaign Medal	With four Campaign Stars
	Order of Leopold II	Grand Cross
	Belgian Croix de Geurre with palm	
	Order of San Marino	Grand Cross
	Order of Tri Shakti Patta	Grand Cross
	Order of Nichan Iftikhar	Grand Cordon
	Order of Ouissam Alaouite	Officer
	Order of Military Merit	Officer
	Campaign Medal (Brazil)	
	Order of the White Lion	
	Czechoslovak War Cross 1939	
	War Merit Cross of Italy	
	Order of the Star of Africa	Grand Commander

=== Arms ===
Coat of arms of Harold Alexander, 1st Earl Alexander of Tunis
Crest An arm in armour, embowed, the hand holding a sword proper, hilt and pommel or. Escutcheon Per pale argent and sable, a chevron, and in base a crescent, all counterchanged; on a canton azure a harp or stringed argent. Supporters Dexter, A piper of the Irish Guards holding under the interior arm a bagpipe; Sinister, A sepoy of the 3rd/2nd Punjabi Regiment supporting with the exterior arm a rifle proper; Each charged on the shoulder with an escutcheon barry nebuly of six argent and azure. Motto "Per mare, per terre, per astra" (By sea, by land, by the stars). Orders The Most Noble Order of the Garter – Knight Companion (KG).

== List of works ==
- Alexander, Harold (3 February 1948). "The African Campaign from El Alamein to Tunis, from 10 August 1942 to 13 May 1943". London Gazette (Supplement 38196). London: King's Printer: 839–887.
- Alexander, Harold (10 February 1948). "Conquest of Sicily 10 July 1943 to 17 August 1943". London Gazette (Supplement 38205). London: King's Printer: 1009–1025.
- Alexander, Harold (6 June 1950). "The Allied Armies in Italy, from 3 September 1943 to 12 December 1944". London Gazette (Supplement 38937). London: King's Printer: 2879–2975.

== See also ==
- Mediterranean, Middle East and African theatres of World War II

== Citations ==
Military offices
Preceded by Clement Armitage	GOC 1st Infantry Division; 1938–1940	Succeeded by Kenneth Anderson
Preceded by Michael Barker	GOC I Corps; June–December 1940	Succeeded by Laurence Carr
Preceded by Sir Claude Auchinleck	GOC-in-C Southern Command; 1940–1942	Succeeded by Sir Charles Loyd
Preceded by Sir Claude Auchinleck	C-in-C Middle East Command; 1942–1943	Succeeded by Sir Henry Wilson
New command	C-in-C 15th Army Group; 1943–1944	Succeeded by Mark Clark
Preceded by Sir Henry Wilson	Supreme Commander Allied Force Headquarters; 1944–1945	Post deactivated
Government offices
Preceded by The Earl of Athlone	Governor General of Canada; 1946–1952	Succeeded by Vincent Massey
Honorary titles
Preceded by The Earl of Cavan	Colonel of the Irish Guards; 1946–1969	Succeeded by Sir Basil Eugster
Political offices
Preceded by Winston Churchill	Minister of Defence; 1952–1954	Succeeded by Harold Macmillan
Honorary titles
Preceded by The Viscount Alanbrooke	Lord Lieutenant of the County of London; 1956–1965	County of London abolished
Preceded by The Earl of Halifax	Grand Master of the Order of Saint Michael and Saint George; 1959–1967	Succeeded by The Duke of Kent
Preceded by The Lord Wilson	Constable of the Tower of London; 1960–1965	Succeeded by Sir Gerald Templer
New title	Lord Lieutenant of Greater London; 1965–1966	Succeeded by Sir Gerald Templer
Peerage of the United Kingdom
New title	Earl Alexander of Tunis; 1952–1969	Succeeded by Shane Alexander
New title	Viscount Alexander of Tunis; 1946–1969; Member of the House of Lords (1946–1969)	Succeeded by Shane Alexander
