= Lord-lieutenant =

Ceremonial office in the United Kingdom

The banner flown by the lords-lieutenant.

A lord-lieutenant (UK: /lɛfˈtɛnənt/ lef-TEN-ənt) is the British monarch's personal representative in each lieutenancy area of the United Kingdom. Historically, each lieutenant was responsible for organising the county's militia. In 1871, the lieutenant's responsibility over the local militia was removed. However, it was not until 1921 that they formally lost the right to call upon able-bodied men to fight when needed.

Lord-lieutenant is now an honorary titular position usually awarded to a notable person in the county, and despite the title of the office, may be either male or female, peer or not.

== Origins ==
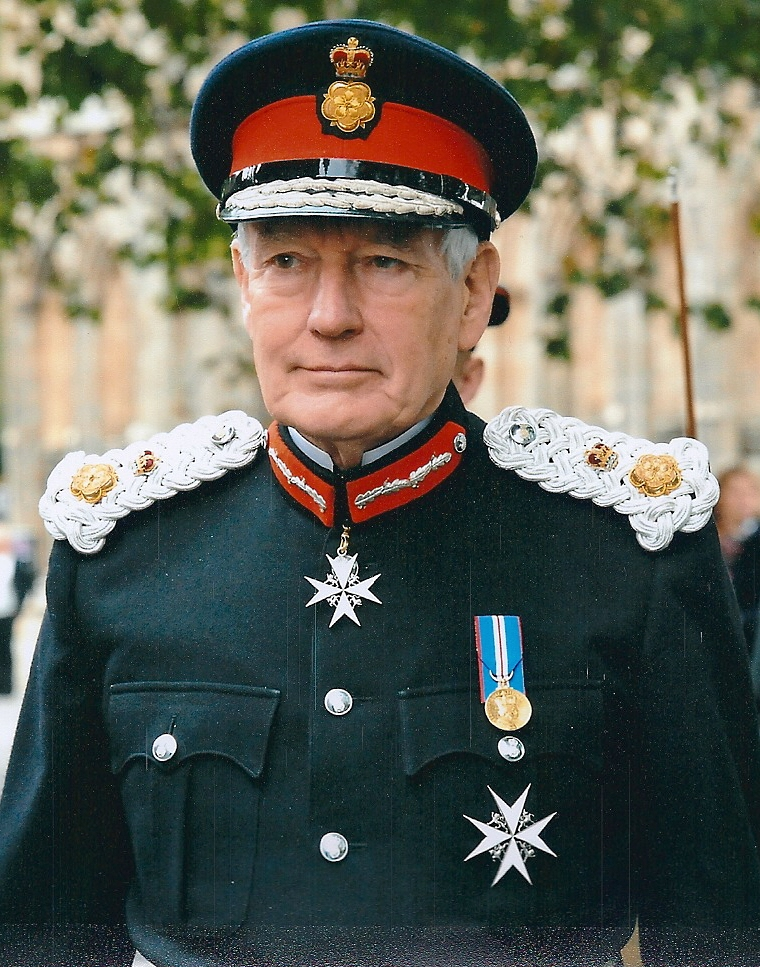
Reflecting the military origins of the lieutenancy, lords-lieutenant – here Lord Crathorne – wear uniform on formal occasions. The uniform of an English lord-lieutenant includes a rose-and-crown badge on the cap and braided shoulder cords.

=== England and Wales ===
Lieutenants were first appointed to a number of English counties by King Henry VIII in the 1540s, when the military functions of the sheriffs were handed over to them. Each lieutenant raised and was responsible for the efficiency of the local militia units of his county, and afterwards of the yeomanry and volunteers. He was commander of these forces, whose officers he appointed. These commissions were originally of temporary duration, and only when the situation required the local militia to be specially supervised and well prepared, often when invasion by Scotland or France might be expected.

Lieutenancies soon became more organised, probably in the reign of Henry's successor King Edward VI, their establishment being approved by the English parliament in 1550. However, it was not until the threat of invasion by the forces of Spain in 1585 that lieutenants were appointed to all counties and counties corporate and became in effect permanent. Although some counties were left without lieutenants during the 1590s, following the defeat of the Spanish Armada, the office continued to exist, and was retained by King James I even after the end of the Anglo-Spanish War.

The office of lieutenant was abolished under the Commonwealth, but was re-established following the Restoration under the City of London Militia Act 1662, which declared that:

[T]he King's most Excellent Majesty, his Heirs and Successors, shall and may from Time to Time, as Occasion shall require, issue forth several Commissions of Lieutenancy to such Persons as his Majesty, his Heirs and Successors, shall think fit to be his Majesty's Lieutenants for the several and respective Counties, Cities and Places of England and Dominion of Wales, and Town of Berwick upon Tweed.

Although not explicitly stated, from that date lieutenants were appointed to "counties at large", with their jurisdiction including the counties corporate within the parent county. For example, lieutenants of Devon in the 17th and 18th centuries appointed deputy lieutenants to the City of Exeter, and were sometimes described as the "Lieutenant of Devon and Exeter". The one exception was Haverfordwest, to which a lieutenant continued to be appointed until 1974. The origin of this anomaly may have lain in the former palatine status of Pembrokeshire.

The official title of the office at this time was His or Her Majesty's "Lieutenant for the county of x", but, as almost all office-holders were peers of the realm, they were referred to as "Lord-Lieutenant". Nowadays, few office-holders are peers.

The City of London was uniquely given a commission of lieutenancy, and was exempt from the authority of the lieutenant of Middlesex. The Constable of the Tower of London and the Warden of the Cinque Ports were ex officio lieutenants for the Tower Hamlets and the Cinque Ports respectively, which were treated as counties in legislation regarding lieutenancy and militia affairs.

=== Ireland ===
In the counties of Ireland, the officer in charge of the county militia was styled "Lieutenant" until James II and "Governor" thereafter. There could be up to three Governors in one county. Responsibility for recommending County magistrates lay with the Custos Rotulorum. The Custos Rotulorum (Ireland) Act 1831 cancelled the commissions of the Governors, transferred the militia and county magistrate functions to the (re)established office of Lieutenant (appointed by letters patent and styled "Lord Lieutenant"), and empowered the Lord Lieutenant of Ireland to appoint deputy lieutenants.

In the Republic of Ireland the office of lord-lieutenant has been rescinded since the creation of the Irish Free State in 1922, and all relevant statutes have been repealed.

=== Northern Ireland ===
In 1921, with the establishment of Northern Ireland, lord lieutenants continued to be appointed through the Governor of Northern Ireland to the six counties and the two county boroughs of Derry and Belfast. Whereas in 1973 the counties and county boroughs were abolished as local government units, lords-lieutenant are now appointed directly by the King to "counties and county boroughs ... as defined for local government purposes immediately before 1 October 1973".

=== Scotland ===
The Royal Banner of Scotland, which can be used by lord-lieutenants in Scotland.

Although Colin, Earl of Balcarres was appointed Lord Lieutenant of Fife in 1688, and lieutenants were appointed to a few counties from about 1715, it was not until 1794 that permanent lieutenancies were established by royal warrant. By the Militia Act 1797, the lieutenants appointed "for the Counties, Stewartries, Cities, and Places" were given powers to raise and command county militia units.

The Lord Provosts of Edinburgh, Glasgow, Aberdeen, and Dundee are, by virtue of office, also the lord-lieutenant of their respective city.

While in their lieutenancies, lords-lieutenant are among the few individuals in Scotland officially permitted to fly the banner of the Royal Arms of Scotland, or "The Lion Rampant" as it is more commonly known.

== 19th century ==
The Militia Act 1802 (42 Geo. 3. c. 90) provided for the appointment of lieutenants to "Lieutenants for the Counties, Ridings, and Places" in England and Wales, and gave them command of the county militia. In the case of towns or cities which were counties of themselves, the "chief magistrate" (meaning the mayor, chief bailiff or other head of the corporation) had the authority to appoint deputy lieutenants in the absence of an appointment of a lieutenant by the crown.

The Regulation of the Forces Act 1871 (34 & 35 Vict. c. 86) removed the lieutenant as head of the county militia, as the jurisdiction, duties and command exercised by the lieutenant were revested in the crown, but the power of recommending for first appointments was reserved to the lieutenant.

The Militia Act 1882 (45 & 46 Vict. c. 49) revested the jurisdiction of the lieutenants in the crown.

The lieutenancies were reestablished on a new basis by section 29 of the Militia Act 1882 which stated that "Her Majesty shall from time to time appoint Lieutenants for the several counties in the United Kingdom". Counties for lieutenancy purposes were also redefined as "a county at large, with the exception that each riding of the county of York shall be a separate county". The text of the letters patent appointing lieutenants under the act stated they were to be:

...Our Lieutenant of and in the County of X and of all cities boroughs liberties places incorporated and privileged and other places whatsoever within the said county and the limits and precincts of the same.

This was a formal recognition of the situation that had existed since 1662 that the lieutenancies for the majority of counties corporate in England were held jointly with their associated county—for example a lieutenant was now appointed for "the County of Gloucester, and the City and County of Gloucester, and the City and County of City of Bristol".

Haverfordwest was permitted to retain a lieutenant while the Tower Hamlets and Cinque Ports were to continue to be regarded as counties for lieutenancy purposes.

From 1889 lieutenancy counties in England and Wales were to correspond to groupings of administrative counties and county boroughs established by the Local Government Act 1888 (51 & 52 Vict. c. 41). The creation of a new County of London absorbed the former Tower Hamlets lieutenancy. The act also extinguished the lieutenancy of the Cinque Ports.

Section 69 of the Local Government (Ireland) Act 1898 (61 & 62 Vict. c. 37) realigned the lieutenancy counties with the new administrative counties created by the act. The one exception was County Tipperary, which although administered by two county councils, was to remain united for lieutenancy. In contrast to legislation in England and Wales, each county borough was to have its own lieutenant, and those counties corporate not made county boroughs were abolished. The effect of this was to create a lieutenant for the county boroughs of Belfast and Londonderry, and to abolish those for the city of Kilkenny, borough of Drogheda and town of Galway.

The office of lieutenant was honorary and held during the royal pleasure, but often for life. Appointment to the office is by letters patent under the great seal. Usually, though not necessarily, the person appointed lieutenant was also appointed custos rotulorum or keeper of the rolls. Appointments to the county's bench of magistrates were usually made on the recommendation of the lieutenant.

== 20th century ==
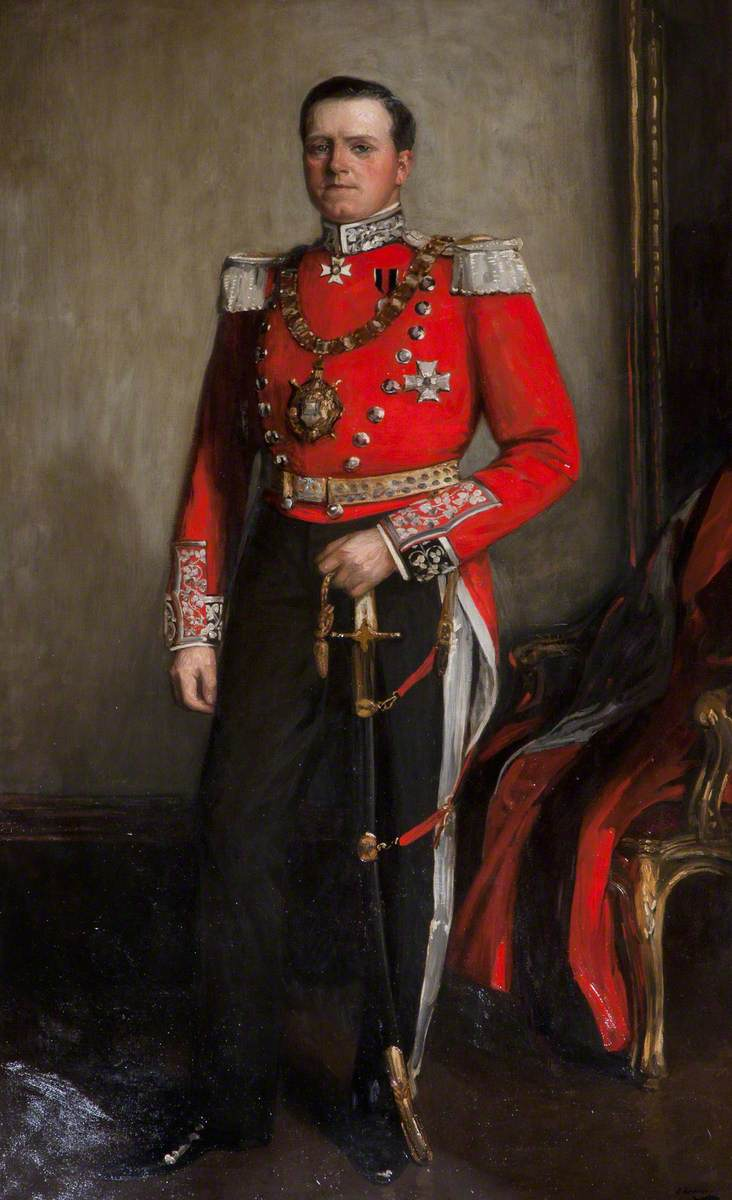
The 9th Earl of Shaftesbury in full-dress uniform as Lord-Lieutenant of Belfast, 1900s.

The Territorial and Reserve Forces Act 1907 (7 Edw. 7. c. 9) established county territorial force associations, of which the lieutenant was to be head, styled president of the county association. It restated the combination of counties and counties corporate as lieutenancy counties.

In 1921, with the establishment of Northern Ireland, lieutenants continued to be appointed through the Governor of Northern Ireland to the six counties and two county boroughs. The creation of the Irish Free State in the following year saw the remaining county lieutenancies in Ireland abolished. In 1973 the counties and county boroughs were abolished as local government units in Northern Ireland, and lord-lieutenants are now appointed directly by the sovereign to "counties and county boroughs... as defined for local government purposes immediately before 1 October 1973". In 1975 the term lord-lieutenant officially replaced that of lieutenant.

Local government reform in England in 1965 led to the appointment of lieutenants to Greater London and Huntingdon and Peterborough, and the abolition of those of the counties of London, Middlesex and Huntingdon.

A more fundamental reform of local government throughout England and Wales (outside Greater London) created a new structure of metropolitan, non-metropolitan and Welsh counties in 1974. Section 218 of the Local Government Act 1972 (c. 70) that established the new system stated: "Her Majesty shall appoint a lord-lieutenant for each county in England and Wales and for Greater London..." The act appears to be the first statutory use of the term "lord-lieutenant" for lieutenants to counties.

Existing lord lieutenants were assigned to one of the corresponding new counties wherever possible. Where this could not be done, the existing office-holder became a lieutenant of a county, junior to the lord-lieutenant. For example, the Lord Lieutenant of Montgomeryshire was appointed Lord Lieutenant of Powys, with those of Breconshire and Radnorshire each being designated as simply "Lieutenant of Powys". This measure was temporary, and no lieutenants have been appointed in this way since 1974, although the power still exists.

In 1975 counties ceased to be used for local government purposes in Scotland. The Local Government (Scotland) Act 1973 (c. 65) replaced the counties with regions, and each region was to have one or more lord-lieutenants appointed. The areas to which they were appointed approximated to the counties and were based and were defined in terms of the new local government districts.

== Present day ==
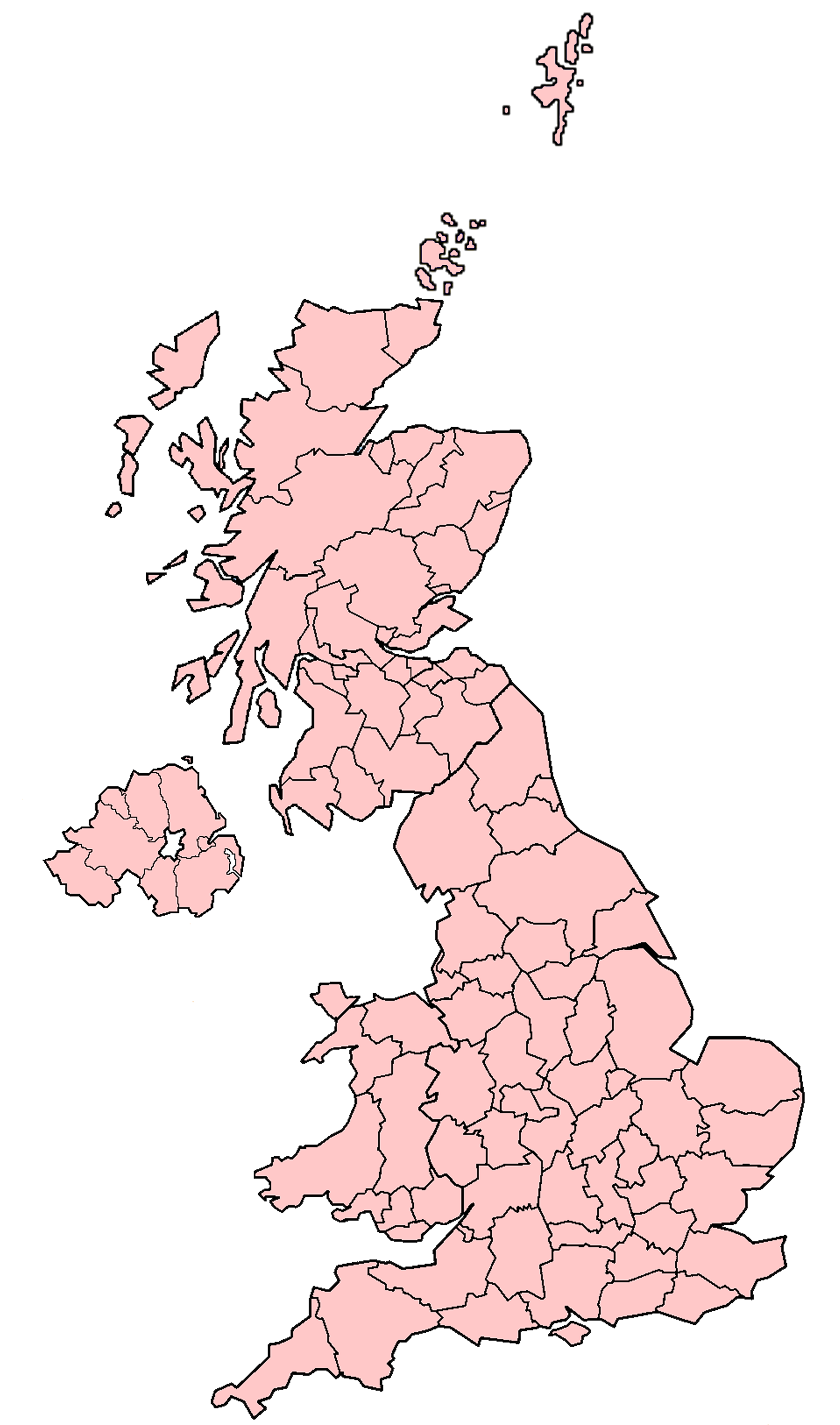
The lieutenancy areas of the United Kingdom as of 2012.

In 1996 Scottish regions and districts were abolished on further local government reorganisation, and since that date Lord-Lieutenants have been appointed to lieutenancy areas, in most places roughly equivalent to the historic Scottish counties.

Partial reform of local government in England since 1995 has led to the creation of counties for the purpose of lieutenancy, also known as ceremonial counties, to which Lord-Lieutenants are now appointed. The Lieutenancies Act 1997 (c. 23) is the most recent piece of primary legislation dealing with lieutenancies in England and includes the definitive list of the current areas used. Ceremonial counties may comprise combinations of county council areas and unitary authority areas, or even parts of them.

Since the local government re-organisation of 1996 in Wales, Lord-Lieutenants are now appointed to preserved counties, i.e. the counties used for administrative purposes from 1974 to 1996.

The City of London was unaffected by changes introduced since 1882. It has a Commission of Lieutenancy rather than a Lord-Lieutenant, headed by the Lord Mayor of London.

=== Duties ===
Lord-Lieutenants are the monarch's representatives in their lieutenancies. Their foremost duty is to uphold the dignity of the Crown, and in so doing they seek to promote a spirit of co-operation and goodwill through the time they give to voluntary and benevolent organisations and through the interest they take in the business and social life of their counties.

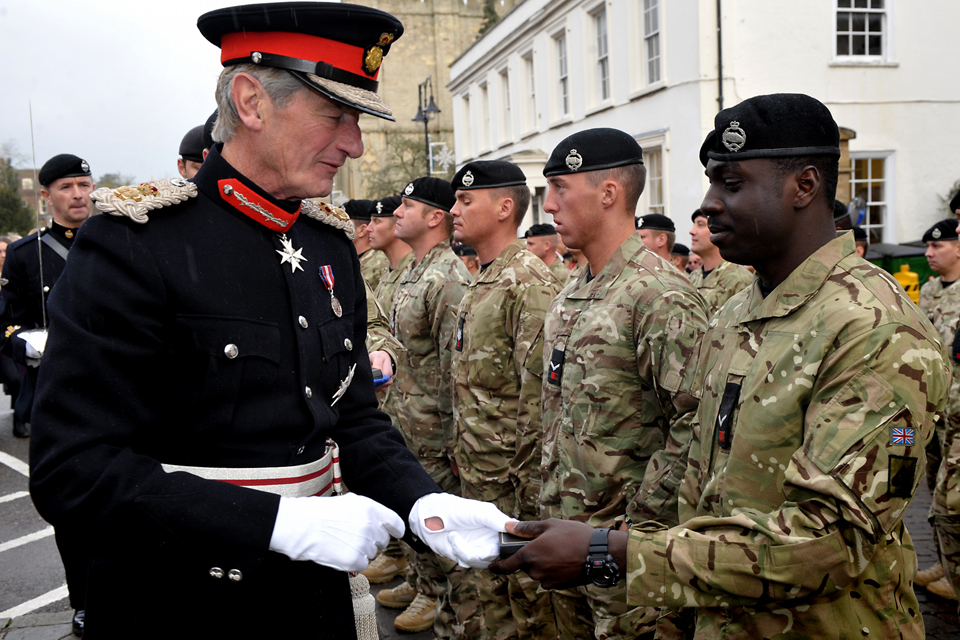
Lord Tollemache presenting medals in November 2012, as Lord-Lieutenant of Suffolk.

The modern responsibilities of Lord-Lieutenants include:

- Arranging visits of members of the royal family and escorting royal visitors;
- Presenting medals and awards on behalf of the sovereign, and advising on honours nominations;
- Participating in civic, voluntary and social activities within the lieutenancy;
- Acting as liaison with local units of the Royal Navy, Royal Marines, Army, Royal Air Force and their associated Cadet Forces;
- Leading the local magistracy as chairman of the Advisory Committee on Justices of the Peace; and
- Chairing the local Advisory Committee for the Appointment of the General Commissioners of Income Tax, a tribunal which hears appeals against decisions made by the HM Revenue and Customs on a variety of different tax-related matters.

As the Sovereign's representative in each county, a Lord-Lieutenant remains non-political and may not hold office in any political party. They are appointed for life, subject to the power of the Sovereign to remove them. In practice, there is a customary age of retirement of 75. This is achieved by beginning a process to appoint a new Lord-Lieutenant in time for the new appointment to take effect when the milestone has been reached.

=== Deputies ===
Each Lord-Lieutenant appoints a Vice-Lieutenant and a number of deputy lieutenants to support them. The Vice-Lieutenant assumes the Lord-Lieutenant's duties when they are abroad, ill, or otherwise incapacitated. The number of deputy lieutenants appointed, typically between thirty and forty, depends on the county's population.

=== Remuneration ===
They are unpaid, but receive minimal allowances for secretarial help, mileage allowance and a driver. Lord-Lieutenants receive an allowance for the ceremonial uniform, worn when receiving members of the Royal Family and on other formal occasions.

=== Uniform ===
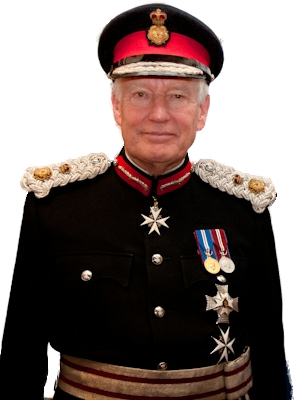
Lord Crathorne in uniform as Lord-Lieutenant of North Yorkshire, 2014. Note the rose badge under the crown, on the cap's band.

Since at least the 18th century, a military-style uniform has been worn by lord-lieutenants (appropriate to the military origins of the post). Since 1831 this has been analogous to the uniform worn by a general staff officer, but with silver lace in place of the gold worn by regular officers. Over time, the design of the uniform changed in line with changes made to army uniform.

At present, it is a dark blue uniform in the style of a General Officer's Army No. 1 dress (but with shoulder cords, sash, collar patch cord, buttons etc. in silver rather than gold). A cap with two rows of silver oak leaf embroidery around the peak is worn, as well as a sword with a steel scabbard. The badge used on the uniform varies depending on where the lieutenant's county is situated – a rose is worn in England, shamrocks in Northern Ireland, a thistle in Scotland and Prince-of-Wales feathers in Wales. On the whole, the lord-lieutenant's insignia resemble a Lieutenant-General of the British Army.

The uniform for a vice lord-lieutenant and for deputy lieutenants is of a similar style, but with features to distinguish it from that of a lord-lieutenant – on shoulder cords, no crown above the national symbol (rose, shamrocks, or thistle); blue cord instead of silver on the red gorget tabs aka collar patches; and only a single row of gold braid around the peak of the cap. In addition, deputy lieutenants wear narrower shoulder cords than their superiors and a crimson sash rather than the lord-lieutenant's silver sash. The vice lord-lieutenant's dress resembles that of a former Brigadier-General of the British Army, while a deputy lieutenant's dress resembles that of a field officer.

The uniform is optional for female lord-lieutenants, vice lord-lieutenants, and deputy lieutenants. If not in uniform, female appointees wear a Badge of Office featuring their national symbol (rose, shamrocks, or thistle) on a bow of white and magenta – the Lieutenancy colours.

==== Badge ====
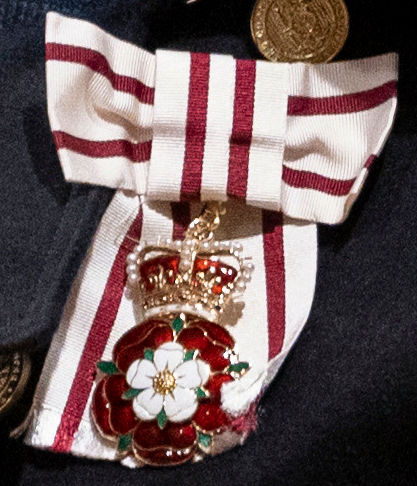
Lord Lieutenant's badge of office for women.

In 1975 a badge was provided for female lord-lieutenants to wear as an optional alternative to the uniform. It consists of an enamel version of the uniform cap badge topped by a jewelled crown, suspended from a ribbon of the same colour as the uniform sash.

== Lord Lieutenant of Ireland ==
The Lord Lieutenant of Ireland was the head of the British administration in Ireland until the foundation of the Irish Free State in 1922.

== Forms of address for lord-lieutenants ==
- Written: '(Title and name), His Majesty's Lord-Lieutenant'
- Salutation: 'Dear Lord-Lieutenant'
- In a speech: 'My Lord-Lieutenant'
- In conversation: '(Title and name)' or 'Lord-Lieutenant'.
- Plural: 'Lord-lieutenants', although the form of 'Lords-Lieutenant' frequently appears.

== Approximate equivalents in other countries ==
In France and Italy, the role of Prefect (préfet in French, prefetto in Italian) is different from that of lord-lieutenant, as the regional and departmental prefects of France are responsible for delivering as well as controlling functions of public services. Similarly to a lord-lieutenant, in Portugal, a representative of the Republic (representante da República in Portuguese) is the personal representative of the Head of State in each of the two autonomous regions of the country, having a limited political role, besides the ceremonial one. In Sweden (as landshövding) and Norway (as fylkesmann), the regional governor is responsible for administrative control functions of services delivered and decisions made by local and county municipalities, as well as representing the king in the region. In the Netherlands, King's commissioners (Commissaris van de Koning in Dutch) are appointed by the monarch, but unlike a lord-lieutenant, belong to a political party. The Lord-lieutenant (UK) and Governor (Indian states) are ceremonial representatives appointed by central authorities. They engage in community initiatives and act as intermediaries between higher authorities and local/state governments.

== See also ==
- Lieutenancy area
- High sheriff
- King's commissioner (Netherlands)
- List of lord-lieutenants in the United Kingdom
- Ceremonial counties of England
- Lieutenancy areas of Scotland
- Preserved counties of Wales
- List of vice-admirals of the coast (posts created in the 1530s to oversee defence of the coast)
- Lord-Lieutenant's Young Person of the Year Awards
- Lord-Lieutenant's Cadet
