= Lord-Lieutenant's Young Person of the Year Awards =

Award for young people in Leicestershire

- Banner flown by lord-lieutenants
- Location: Leicestershire
- Country: United Kingdom

The Lord-Lieutenant's Young Person of the Year Awards is an annual awards ceremony, established in 2003, held by the Lord Lieutenant of Leicestershire for Leicestershire's finest teenagers and the county's most outstanding young people.
