= Earl Alexander of Tunis =

Earldom in the Peerage of the United Kingdom

Earldom Alexander of Tunis
- Blazon Arms: Per pale Argent and Sable, a Chevron and in base a Crescent all counter-changed, on a Canton Azure, a Harp Or, stringed Argent. Crest: Arm in armour embowed, the hand holding a Sword proper, hilt and pommel Or. Supporters: Dexter: a Piper of the Irish Guards, holding under the interior arm a Bagpipe proper, charged on the shoulder with an Escutcheon barry nebuly of six Argent and Azure. Sinister: a Sepoy of the 3rd/2nd Punjabi Regiment, holding in the exterior hand a rifle proper, charged on the shoulder with an Escutcheon barry nebuly of six Argent and Azure.
- Creation date: 14 March 1952
- Created by: Queen Elizabeth II
- Peerage: Peerage of the United Kingdom
- First holder: Harold Alexander, 1st Viscount Alexander of Tunis
- Present holder: Shane Alexander, 2nd Earl Alexander of Tunis
- Heir presumptive: The Hon. Brian James Alexander
- Remainder to: the 1st Earl's heirs male of the body lawfully begotten
- Subsidiary titles: Viscount Alexander of Tunis; Baron Rideau
- Status: Extant
- Motto: MARE, PER TERRAS, PER ASTRA (By sea, by land, by the stars)

Earl Alexander of Tunis is a title in the Peerage of the United Kingdom. It was created on 14 March 1952 for the prominent military commander Field Marshal Harold Alexander, 1st Viscount Alexander of Tunis. He had already been created Viscount Alexander of Tunis, of Errigal in the County of Donegal, on 1 March 1946, and was made Baron Rideau, of Ottawa and of Castle Derg in the County of Tyrone, at the same time he was given the earldom. These titles are also in the Peerage of the United Kingdom. Alexander was the third son of James Alexander, 4th Earl of Caledon.

He was succeeded by his eldest son, the second and present holder of the titles. He briefly served as a Lord-in-waiting (government whip in the House of Lords) under Edward Heath from January to March 1974. However, he lost his seat in the House of Lords after the passing of the House of Lords Act 1999. As a male line descendant of the fourth Earl of Caledon, he is also in remainder to this peerage and its subsidiary titles.

== Coat of arms ==
The arms of the Earls Alexander are the same as those of the Earls of Caledon because the Earls Alexander descend from the Earls of Caledon.

The heraldic blazon for the coat of arms of the Earldom is: Per pale argent and sable a chevron and in base a crescent all counterchanged, on a canton azure a harp or stringed argent. This can be translated as: a shield divided vertically, the left half white and the right half black. In the centre a chevron and below this a crescent, both counterchanged with the colours of the background. In the top left corner a blue rectangle containing a gold harp with white strings.

== Earls Alexander of Tunis (1952) ==
- Harold Rupert Leofric George Alexander, 1st Earl Alexander of Tunis (1891–1969)
- Shane William Desmond Alexander, 2nd Earl Alexander of Tunis (b. 1935)

The sole person in line to succeed is the present holder's brother, the Hon. Brian James Alexander (b. 1939).

== See also ==
- Earl of Caledon
- Cable-Alexander baronets
