= McShain =

McShain is a surname. Notable people with the surname include:

- Danny McShain (1912–1992), American professional wrestler
- John McShain (1896–1989), American contractor
- Mary McShain (1907–1998), Irish-American landowner and philanthropist
