= Killarney House =

Irish country home

Coordinates: 52°3′33.48″N 9°31′26.90″W

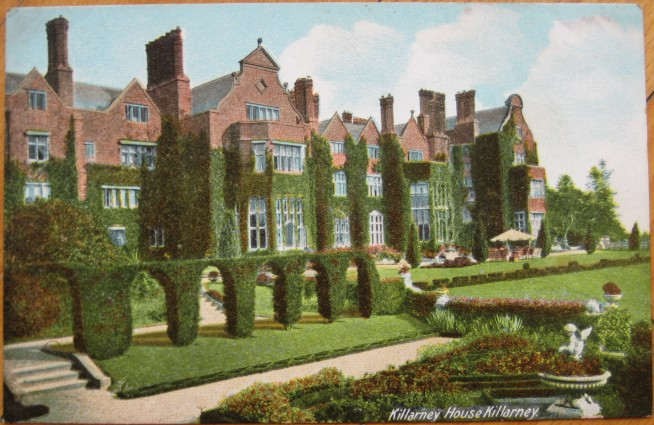
The original Killarney House, which burnt down in 1913.

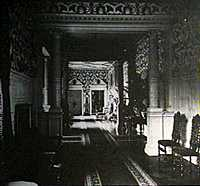
Corridor, Killarney House

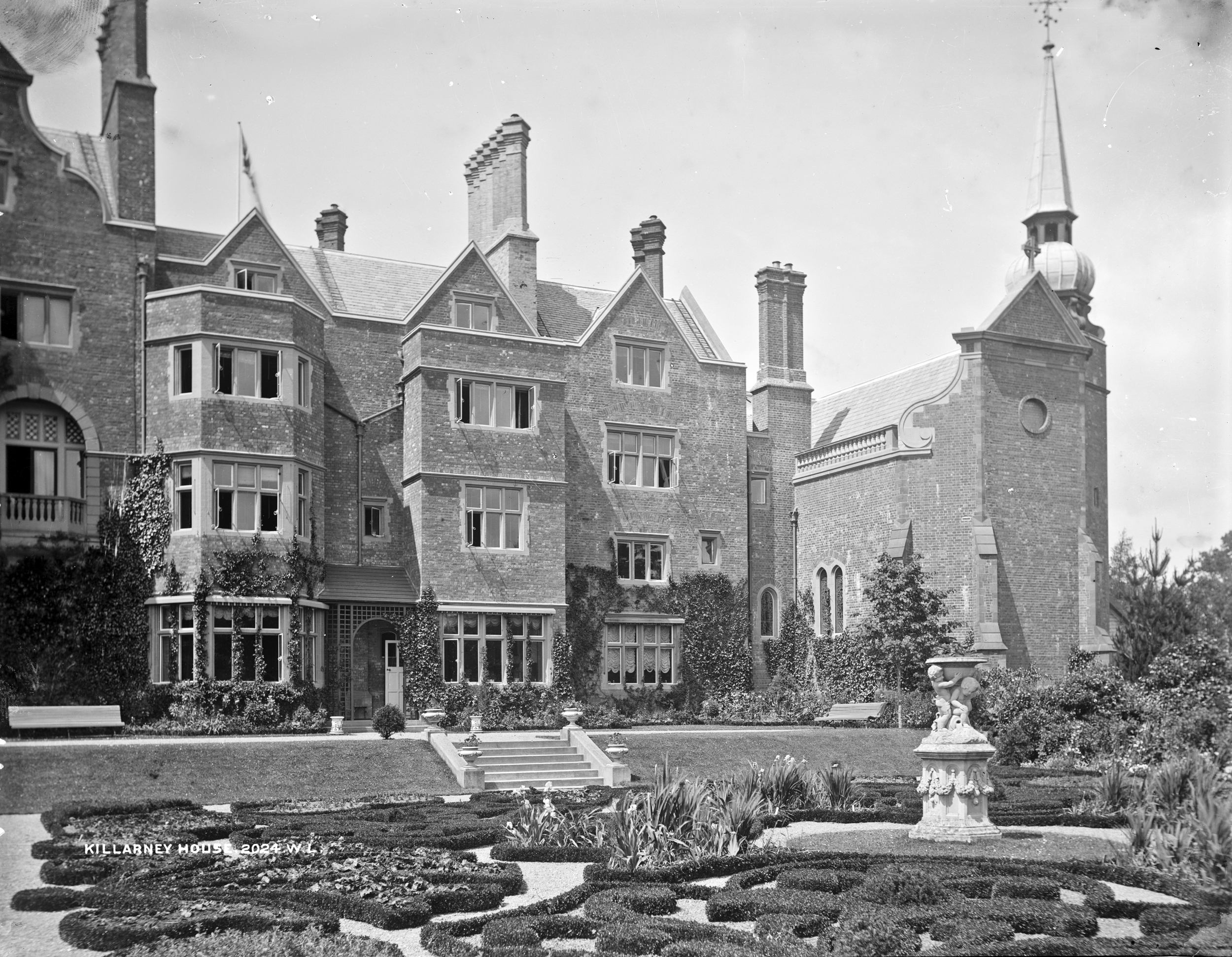
Killarney House, County Kerry, Ireland (c 1898)

Killarney House is an Irish country home in Killarney, County Kerry, which was built as a replacement for Kenmare House (1726) as the seat of the Earls of Kenmare. The site was chosen by Queen Victoria on her visit to Ireland in 1861.

== First Killarney House ==
It was The 4th Earl of Kenmare who decided to build a new mansion on a hillside with views of Lough Leane in 1872. The old manor, Kenmare House, was demolished and an Elizabethan-Revival manor house on a more elevated site erected at a cost was well over £100,000 (equivalent to £9,777,000 in 2025).

This house was supposed to have been instigated by Lady Kenmare (Gertrude Thynne, granddaughter of The 2nd Marquess of Bath) and inspired by Lord Bath's genuinely Elizabethan seat, Longleat, Wiltshire (which is not red-brick); but it was not unusual for the descendants of Elizabethan or Jacobean settlers in Ireland to assert their comparative 'antiquity' in this period by building Jacobethan houses. The architect was George Devey but, according to Jeremy Williams, "... that feeling of being built up over the centuries that distinguished Devey's work was entirely lacking, partly due to the job being supervised by W.H. Lynn [the Belfast architect] at his most relentless ... The westernmost gate lodge, gabled and galleried, [which survives, is] Devey at his most delightful."

The house, in addition to its other defects, apparently did not sit happily in the landscape as it had many gables and many oriels. The interior was panelled and hung with Spanish leather. It was considered one of the finest mansions in Ireland. It was burnt out twice - once in 1879, just after its completion, and again, and finally, in August 1913 and never rebuilt. Instead, The 5th Earl of Kenmare decided to convert the nearby stable block of the old Kenmare House for family use, also naming it "Kenmare House".

== Knockreer House ==
In 1956, Beatrice Grosvenor (1915–1985), niece of the seventh Gerald Ralph Desmond Browne, 7th Earl of Kenmare (1896–1952) and granddaughter of the Duke of Westminster, built Knockreer House on the site of the former "Killarney House". The house was designed by Mrs Grosvenor's cousin Francis Pollen (1926–87). Knockreer House and the surrounding land, formerly part of the Kenmare Estate of the Earls of Kenmare, were later donated by Mrs Grosvenor to form Killarney National Park.

== Second Killarney House ==
Also in 1956, Mrs Grosvenor sold the second "Kenmare House" together with 25,000 acres (100 km^{2}) to an American syndicate, which in turn resold it in 1959 to John McShain (1898–1989), an American building contractor. He and his wife Mary J. Horstmann (1907–1998) extensively renovated the building and renamed it "Killarney House". Having been empty for several years, the building fell into some disrepair. In July 2011 Leo Varadkar, then the Irish Minister for Transport, Tourism and Sport, therefore announced a €7 million restoration of the manor. After the completion of the restoration works, Killarney House was opened to the public on 3 April 2016.
