= Barclay Hotel (Philadelphia) =

Coordinates: 39.94874°N 75.17072°W

Barclay Hotel Barclay Condominiums
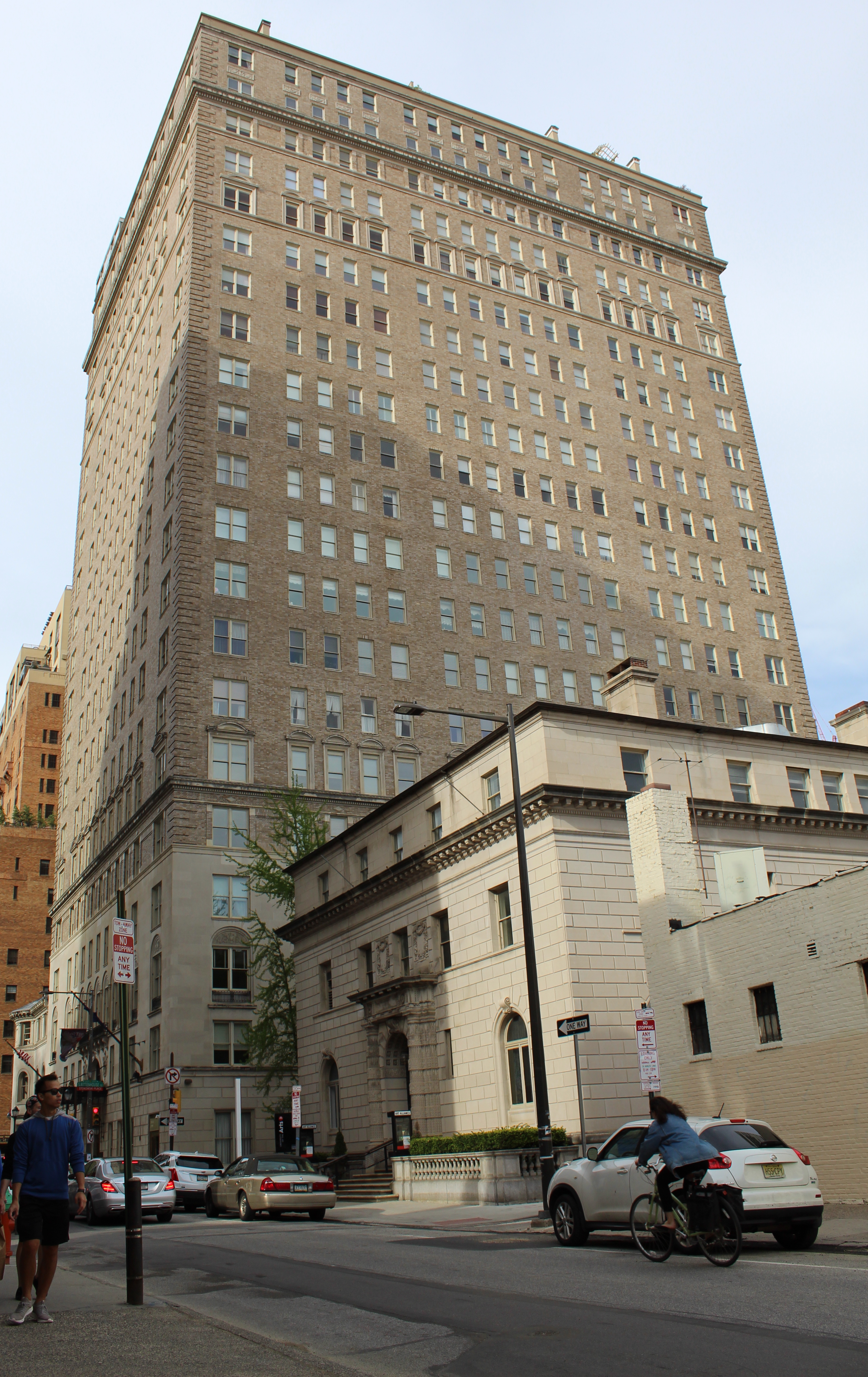
- Barclay Hotel in April 2019

General information
- Location: Rittenhouse Square, Philadelphia, 237 S. 18th Street; Philadelphia, Pennsylvania 19103
- Opening: 1929
- Closed: 1994
- Owner: Allan Domb Real Estate

Design and construction
- Architects: James Edwin Ruthven Carpenter Jr., John McShain (contractor Barclay Hotel) and Shay Construction (Barclay Condominium renovation)

Other information
- Parking: located at 18th Street and Walnut Street

Website
- Rental and Sales Listings

The Barclay Hotel (The Barclay), now Barclay Condominiums, is located at 237 South 18th Street on Rittenhouse Square in Philadelphia, Pennsylvania.

== History ==
The Barclay Hotel opened in October 1929. It was, for a period of time, the most famous hotel in Philadelphia. It was owned by the well-known developer John McShain.

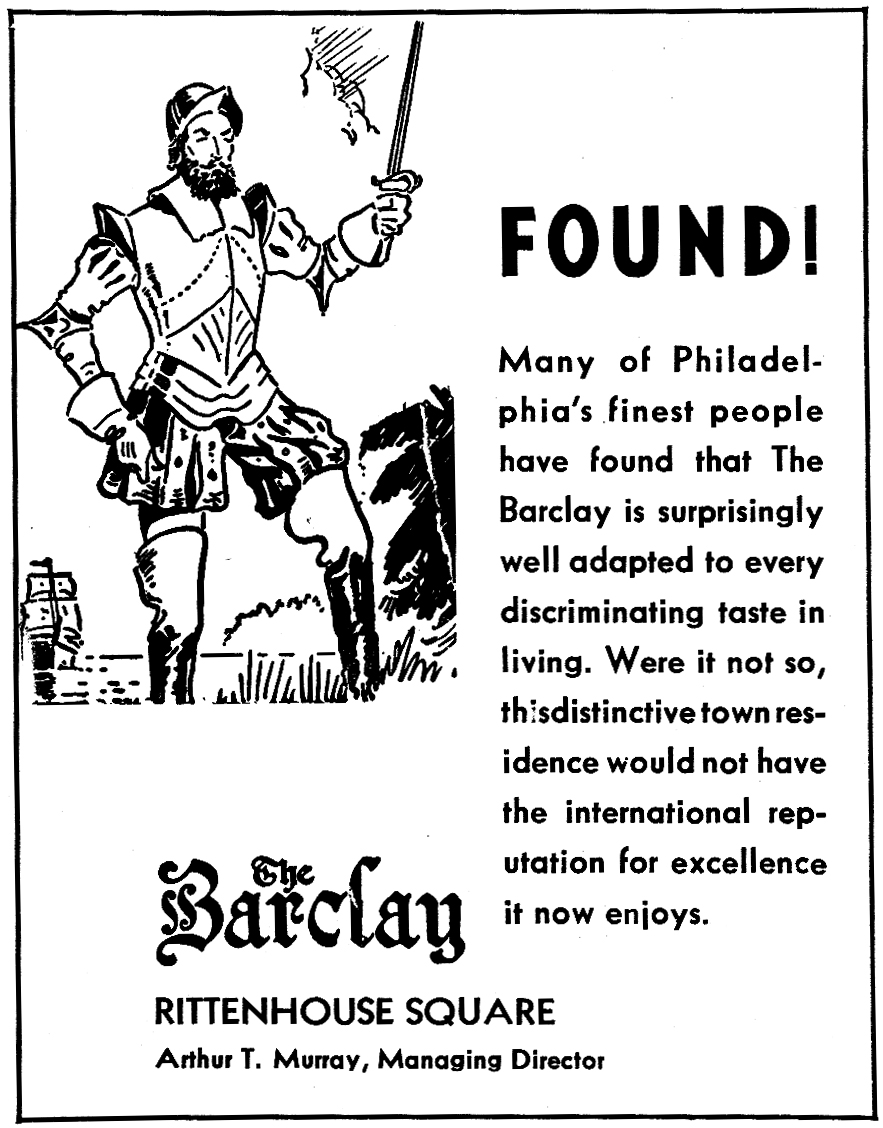
A 1938 advertisement for the hotel

=== Abscam scandal ===
In 1980, the hotel was the site of the FBI's Abscam sting operation, which exposed corruption in government. Federal agents posing as Arab sheikhs rented a suite in the hotel, where they solicited the help of local, state, and federal officials.

=== Condominium conversion ===
In 1989, the hotel was put up for sale for approximately $30 million. In April 1992, owner Barclay Hotel Associates filed for Chapter 11 bankruptcy. The property was subsequently purchased by Princeton, New Jersey developer Peter Marks for $4.3 million in October 1994. Construction on the Barclay Condominiums was completed in 2005.

== Literary references ==
In the 1994 novel The Fermata by Nicholson Baker, the narrator first discovers his ability to "freeze time" while staying at the Barclay Hotel as a child.

In the 1995 novel Red, Red Robin by Stephen Gallagher the Barclay Hotel's cocktail bar is the scene of the first meeting of protagonist Ruth Lasseter and Tim Hagan ahead of their fateful evening at a black-tie ball in Rittenhouse Square.
