= Edith Ogden Heidel =

American sculptor

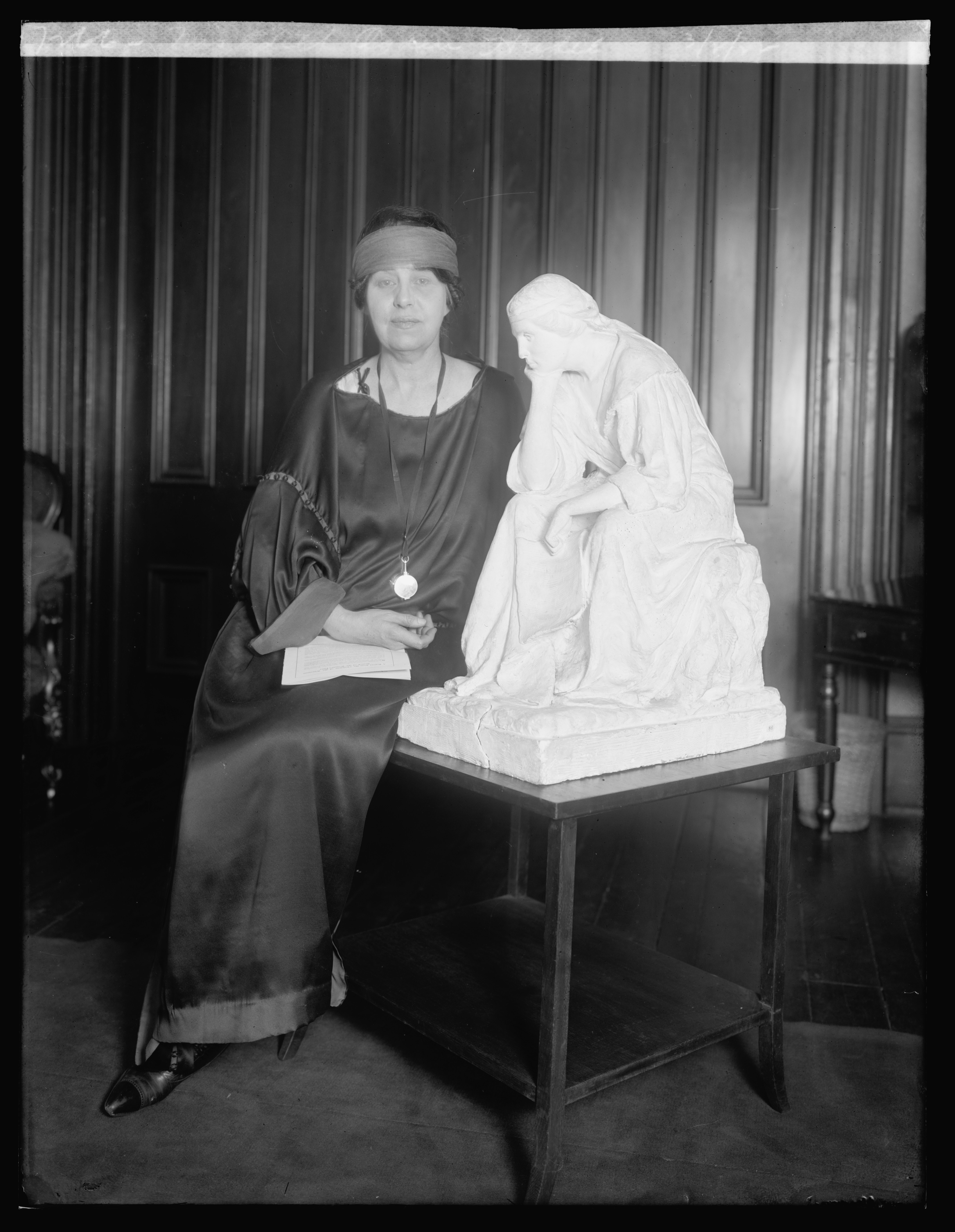
- Edith Ogden Heidel, 1922
- Born: February 8, 1870; Saint Paul, Minnesota
- Died: December 7, 1956 (aged 86)
- Education: Art Students League of New York
- Occupation: Sculptor

Edith Hope Ogden Heidel (February 8, 1870 – December 7, 1956) was an American sculptor. Born in Saint Paul, Minnesota, Heidel studied sculpture with Augustus Saint-Gaudens at the Art Students League of New York. Sometime during the 1890s she moved to Washington, D.C., where she was active for several decades. Around 1901 she was teaching sculpture at the Corcoran School of Art, where among her pupils was Rudolph Evans. From 1898 until 1924 she participated in exhibitions of the Society of Washington Artists; she was also active showing work with the National League of American Pen Women of the District of Columbia and the Arts Club of Washington. Heavily involved in the movement for equal rights, Heidel produced a number of sculptures for the cause. One of these, The Closed Door, appeared on the cover of the National Woman's Party organ, Equal Rights magazine. Another, a plaster piece titled The Thinking Woman and inspired by Auguste Rodin's The Thinker, was donated to the Party in 1922 to stand in their headquarters building on Capitol Hill. Heidel is buried at Oakland Cemetery in Saint Paul.
