= Kenmare House =

Historic house in County Kerry, Ireland

Coordinates: 52.06543°N 9.5367°W

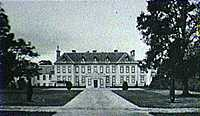
Kenmare House 1726

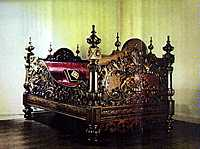
Queen Victoria's Bed depicting the coming of the Brownes to Ireland

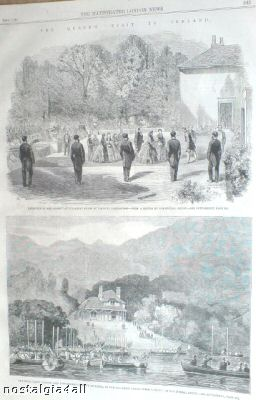
Lord Castlerosse greets the Queen at Kenmare House

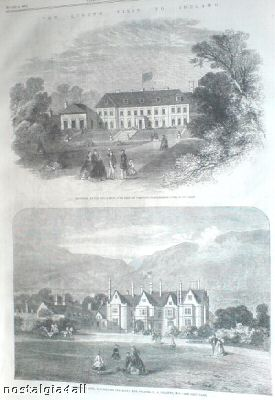
Kenmare House flies the Royal Standard

Kenmare House is an 18th century house in Killarney, County Kerry located on the east shore of Lough Leane and was the principal residence of the Brownes of Killarney, Earls of Kenmare.

== History ==
Sir Valentine Browne and his son, also Valentine Browne, were the first members of the family to settle in Ireland being appointed Surveyor General of Ireland in 1559. Sir Valentine Browne made an agreement with MacCarty Mór for a lease on the lands of Coshmang and Ross in 1588, the year of the Armada. Unlike most of the English settlers since the Reformation, the Brownes soon reverted to the old religion and the family continued to be given the royal title "Viscounts Kenmare" by King James II of England in 1689. It may be remarked here that this title is derived from Kenmare Castle, near Hospital, part of the County Limerick estate of the Browne family, and not, as might naturally be supposed, from the town of that name, which is not actually on the Browne estate. The family's first residence in Killarney was Ross Castle.

The original Kenmare House was built in 1726, after the estates were recovered by the 5th Baronet and 3rd Viscount Kenmare. It was a grandiose structure with the characteristics of a French chateau, perhaps influenced by the Brownes' time spent in France with King James II in exile at Château de Saint-Germain-en-Laye. The house was part of the 137,000-acre estate of the Brownes, who remarkably retained their lands during the Penal Laws as Catholics.

Viscount Kenmare designed the house himself. The house was two stories high and had dormered attics and steep, slated roofs. There were thirteen bays in front of the house, with three bays on each side of the centre breaking forward. A servants' wing was added around 1775.

It is the 4th Viscount Kenmare, Thomas Browne, who is credited with bringing tourism to Killarney. He was also the head of the Catholic Committee. In the years that followed poets such as Tennyson and Wordsworth, and, writers such as Sir Walter Scott and Jane Austen all visited Killarney.

Early writers praised the house: Smith (1756) praised the seat and gardens as did Coquebert (1790), who mentioned that the chimneys were made of marble (rose-coloured and grey and black). O'Donovan (1846) thought it a handsome house, beautifully shaded with trees and shrubs.

On 26 August 1861, Valentine, Lord Castlerosse played host to Queen Victoria and Prince Albert at Killarney. The royal visit put Killarney on the map as a tourist resort and set the scene for the prosperity and popularity it enjoys today. It must also have been the Queen and Prince's last tour together, as the Prince died in December 1861. During the visit of Queen Victoria to Kenmare House, she chose the site of Killarney House, a vast Victorian-Tudor mansion, which was the successor to Kenmare House. In June 1866 King Leopold II of Belgium visited the Kenmares at Killarney.

The original house was demolished in 1872 by the fourth Earl. The succeeding house was accidentally destroyed by fire in 1913 and never rebuilt; instead, the stable block of the original Kenmare House was converted into the present Killarney House, although the Brownes called it Kenmare House. During this time Edward VII and Queen Alexandra and, later, George V and Queen Mary paid visits to the Kenmares in the years before the First World War.

Sir Edwin Lutyens (the architect for Lady Kenmare's brother, the 3rd Lord Revelstoke, at Lambay Castle on Lambay Island, County Dublin) advised Lord Kenmare to build the second Kenmare House in 1915. This house was later abandoned and sold in 1956 to John McShain when a new Kenmare House was built by the heir to the Browne estates, Beatrice Grosvenor (granddaughter of the Duke of Westminster). In 1974, the new manor which was constructed on the site of the former Killarney House by Grosvenor in 1956 was replaced. This last Kenmare House was built on the Killorglin Road, beside the Killarney golf course and the Castlerosse Hotel.

The sale of Kenmare House in 1985 to Denis Kelleher marked the end of the Kenmare family's proprietary connection with Killarney after 450 years.
