= Rudulph Evans =

American sculptor

- Born: February 1, 1878; Washington, D.C., U.S.
- Died: January 16, 1960 (aged 81)
- Known for: Sculpture
- Notable work: Statue of Thomas Jefferson inside the Jefferson Memorial

Rudulph Evans (February 1, 1878 – January 16, 1960) was a sculptor.

== Early life and education ==
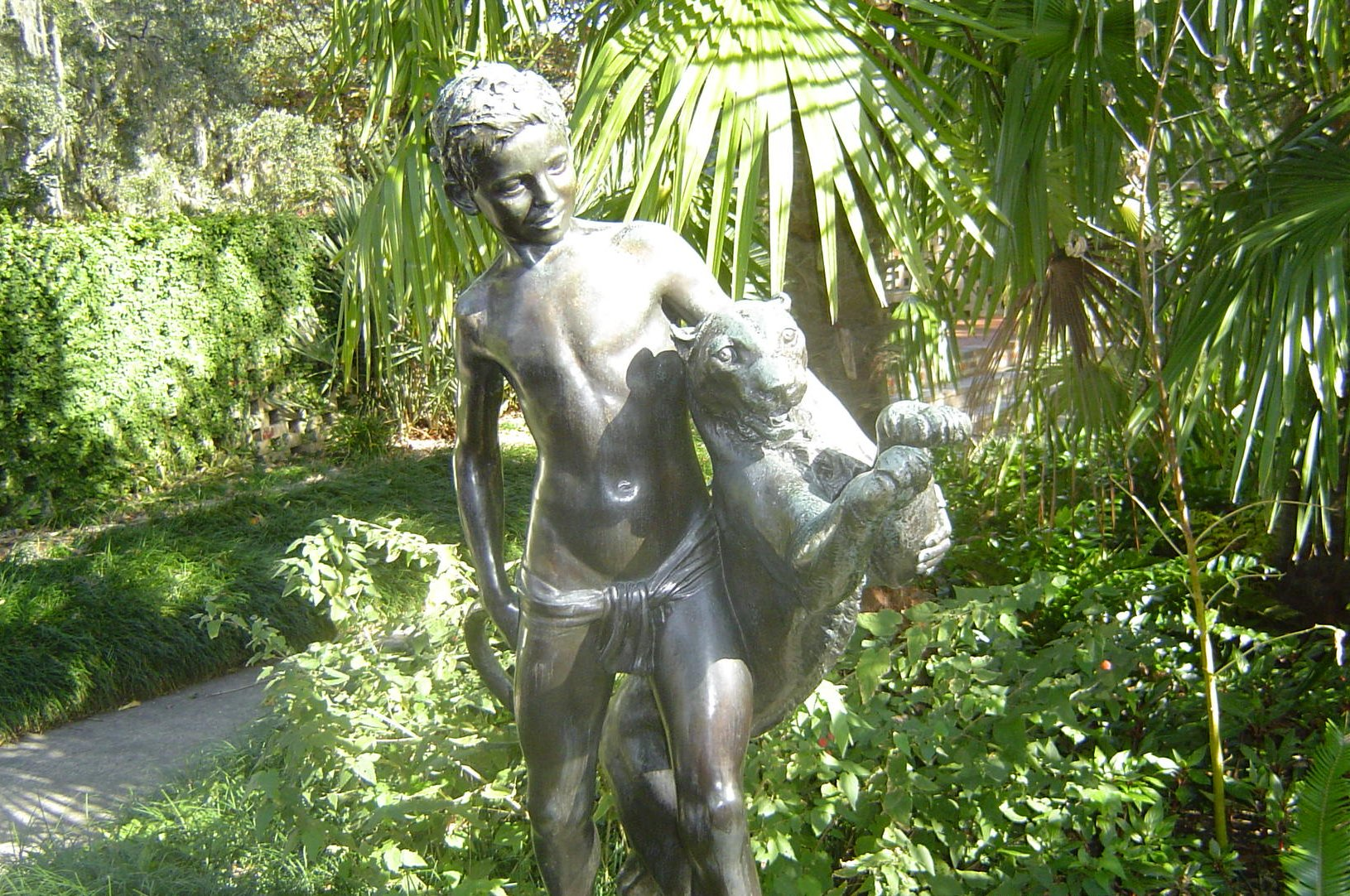
Boy and Panther by Rudulph Evans, based on Rudyard Kipling's Mowgli, located in Brookgreen Gardens, South Carolina

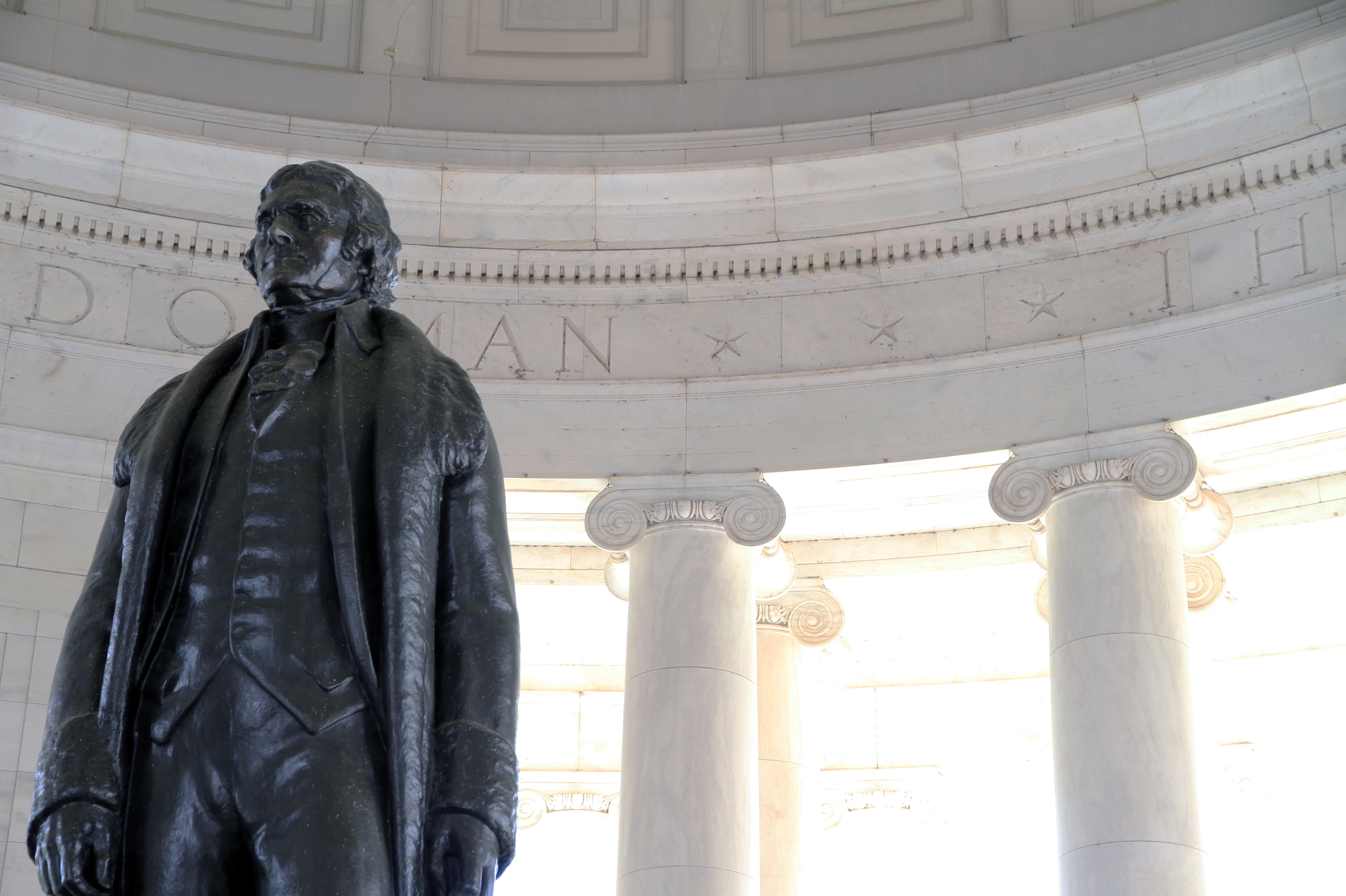
Evans' 1947 statue of Thomas Jefferson, exhibited in the Jefferson Memorial in Washington, D.C.

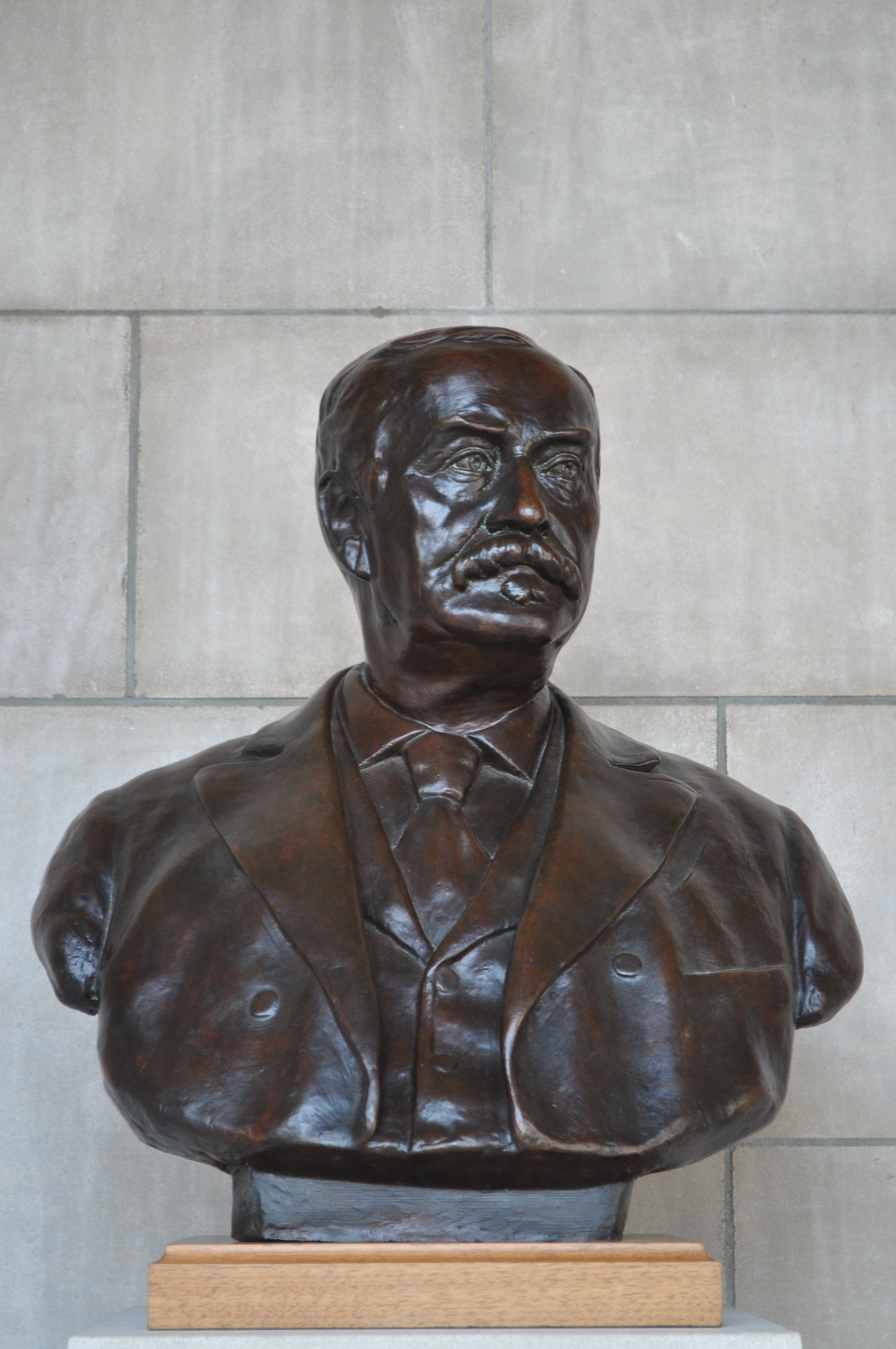
Bust of Julius Sterling Morton by Evans, created in 1896 for the Nebraska Hall of Fame.

Evans was born February 1, 1878, in Washington, D.C., to Frank L. Evans, the descendant of a Quaker family, and Elizabeth J. Grimes, the daughter of Gassaway Sellman Grimes, a physician. He grew up in Front Royal, Virginia, and studied in France at the École des Beaux-Arts; his fellow students included Auguste Rodin and Augustus Saint-Gaudens. He also studied at Corcoran School of Art under Edith Ogden Heidel.

== Career ==
After returning to the United States in 1900, Evans established and maintained a studio in New York City. The 1926 Montparnasse census reported his living at 17 rue Campagne Premiere in the 14th district together with his wife Jeanne Evans born in 1875 in Illinois. In 1918, he was elected into the National Academy of Design as an associate member and became a full academician in 1929. He moved back to Washington, D.C., in 1949. Evans designed the statue of Thomas Jefferson inside the Jefferson Memorial in Washington, D.C. At the time the memorial was inaugurated, in 1943, due to material shortages during World War II, the statue was of plaster patinated to resemble bronze; the finished bronze was cast by Roman Bronze Works of New York City in 1947.

Evans' other noted works include the statues of Julius Sterling Morton (1937) and of William Jennings Bryan (1937), both in the National Statuary Hall Collection of the United States Capitol. Evans also sculpted the statue of Robert E. Lee (1932) in the Virginia State Capitol. His statue of Lee was removed in July 2020 from the Old House Chamber in the Virginia Capitol.
