= Mary McShain =

Irish-American landowner and philanthropist

- Born: Mary Horstmann; 27 March 1907; Philadelphia, Pennsylvania, U.S.
- Died: December 2, 1998 (aged 91); Killarney House, County Kerry, Ireland
- Resting place: Philadelphia, Pennsylvania, U.S.
- Spouse: John McShain (m. 1927; died 1989)
- Children: 1

Mary McShain (March 27, 1907 – December 2, 1998) was an Irish-American landowner and benefactor.

== Biography ==
Mary McShain was born Mary Horstmann in Philadelphia, Pennsylvania on 27 March 1907. Her parents were Ignatius J. Horstmann and his wife Pauline. She was the fifth of six children. She attended St Leonard's Academy, Philadelphia, and Rosemont College, Rosemont. In 1927 she married John McShain, building contractor who worked on the reconstruction of the White House and the building of the Jefferson memorial, the Pentagon, and the JFK Centre for the Performing Arts. They were both interested in horse breeding and racing, establishing a stable of racehorses in 1952. They expanded this stable to Ireland in 1955, hiring first Vincent O'Brien and then John Oxx as trainers. Their greatest success was the horse Ballymoss.

The McShains moved to Ireland in 1960, buying Killarney House, County Kerry and a large portion of the Kenmare estate. They gave Innisfallen Island and the ruins of an abbey to the Irish state in 1973, bestowing guardianship of Ross Island and its castle to the state. For a nominal fee, they turned over the entire estate to the state in 1979, stipulating a life tenancy of the house and some land, with the rest of the land being incorporated into Killarney National Park.

McShain was a Dame of Malta and a Lady of the Grand Cross of the Holy Sepulchre. She received the Pro Ecclesia et Pontifice Cross in 1976. She was awarded two honorary doctorates in 1977, one from LaSalle University, Philadelphia and one from her alma mater, Rosemont College. She died at Killarney House on 2 December 1998. She was buried beside her husband in Holy Cross Cemetery, Philadelphia. Her daughter, Pauline McShain, was a sister of the Society of the Holy Child Jesus. Pauline McShain died on March 8, 2019, due to complications of pneumonia.
