= Jefferson Memorial =

National memorial in Washington, D.C.

- U.S. National Register of Historic Places
- U.S. National Memorial
- D.C. Inventory of Historic Sites
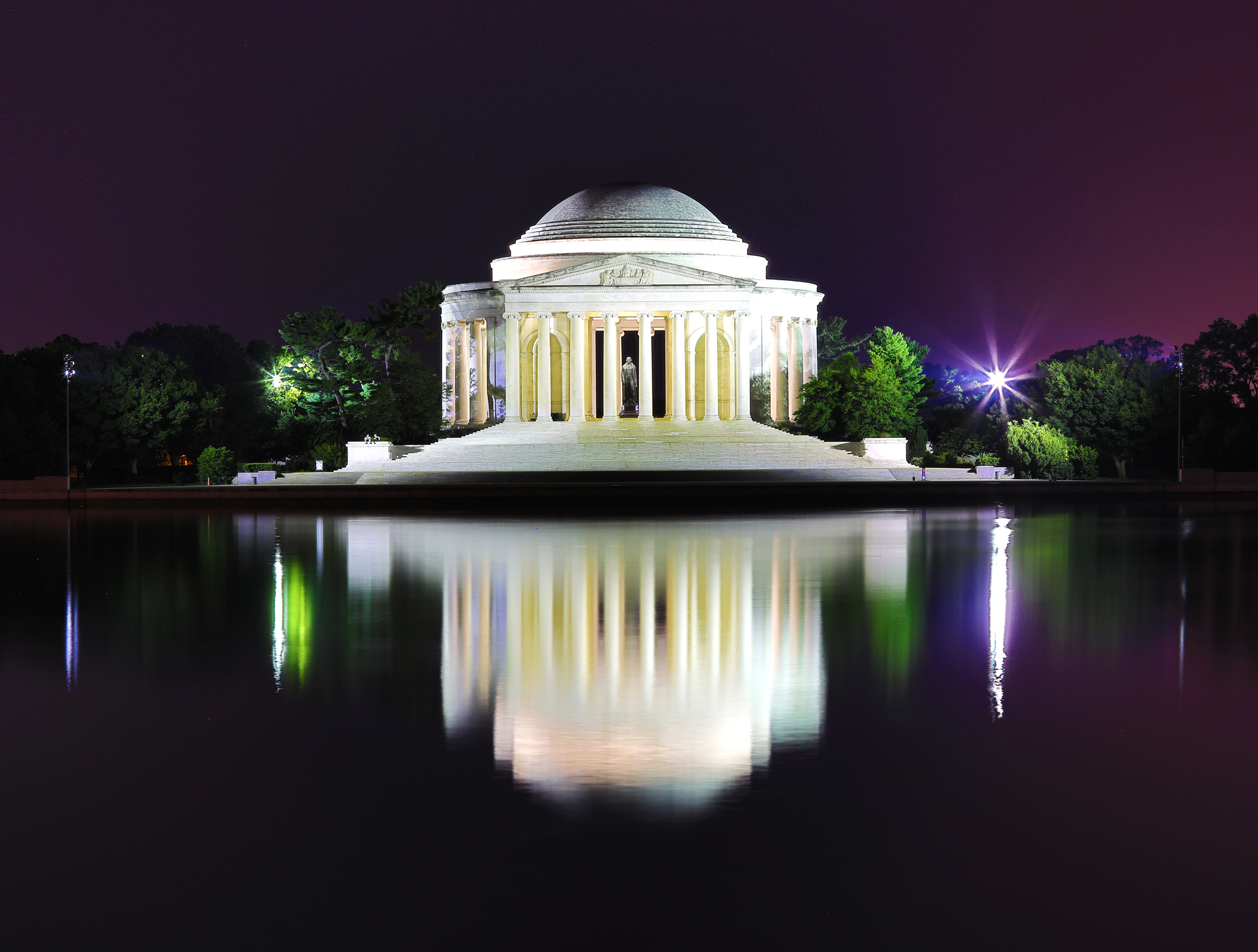
- Jefferson Memorial across the Tidal Basin in August 2018

- Location within Central Washington, D.C. Location within the United States
- Location: 900 Ohio Drive, S.W., National Mall, Washington, D.C., U.S.
- Coordinates: 38°52′53″N 77°02′11.5″W
- Area: 18.36 acres
- Built: 1943; 83 years ago
- Architect: John Russell Pope; Eggers & Higgins
- Architectural style: Classical Revival
- Visitation: 2,551,114 (2025)
- Website: Thomas Jefferson Memorial
- NRHP reference No.: 66000029
- DCIHS No.: 303

Significant dates
- Added to NRHP: October 15, 1966
- Designated NMEM: April 13, 1943
- Designated DCIHS: November 8, 1964

The Thomas Jefferson Memorial is a national memorial in Washington, D.C., built in honor of Thomas Jefferson, the principal author of the United States Declaration of Independence and the nation's third president. Built between 1939 and 1943, the memorial features multiple quotes from Jefferson intended to capture his ideology and philosophy, known as Jeffersonian democracy. Jefferson was widely considered among the most influential political minds of his era and one of the most consequential intellectual forces behind both the American Revolution and the American Enlightenment.

The Jefferson Memorial is built in neoclassical style and is situated in West Potomac Park on the shore of the Potomac River. It was designed by John Russell Pope, a New York City architect, and built by Philadelphia contractor John McShain. Construction on the memorial began in 1939 and was completed in 1943, though the bronze statue of Jefferson was not completed and added until four years after its dedication and opening, in 1947. Pope made references to the Roman Pantheon, whose designer was Apollodorus of Damascus, and to Jefferson's own design for the rotunda at the University of Virginia as inspirations for the memorial's aesthetics. The Jefferson Memorial and the White House form anchor points to the National Mall in Washington, D.C..

The Jefferson Memorial is a designated national memorial and is managed by the National Park Service of the U.S. Department of the Interior's National Mall and Memorial Parks division. It is listed on the National Register of Historic Places and ranked fourth on the American Institute of Architects' "list of America's favorite architecture".

== History ==
=== Early considerations ===
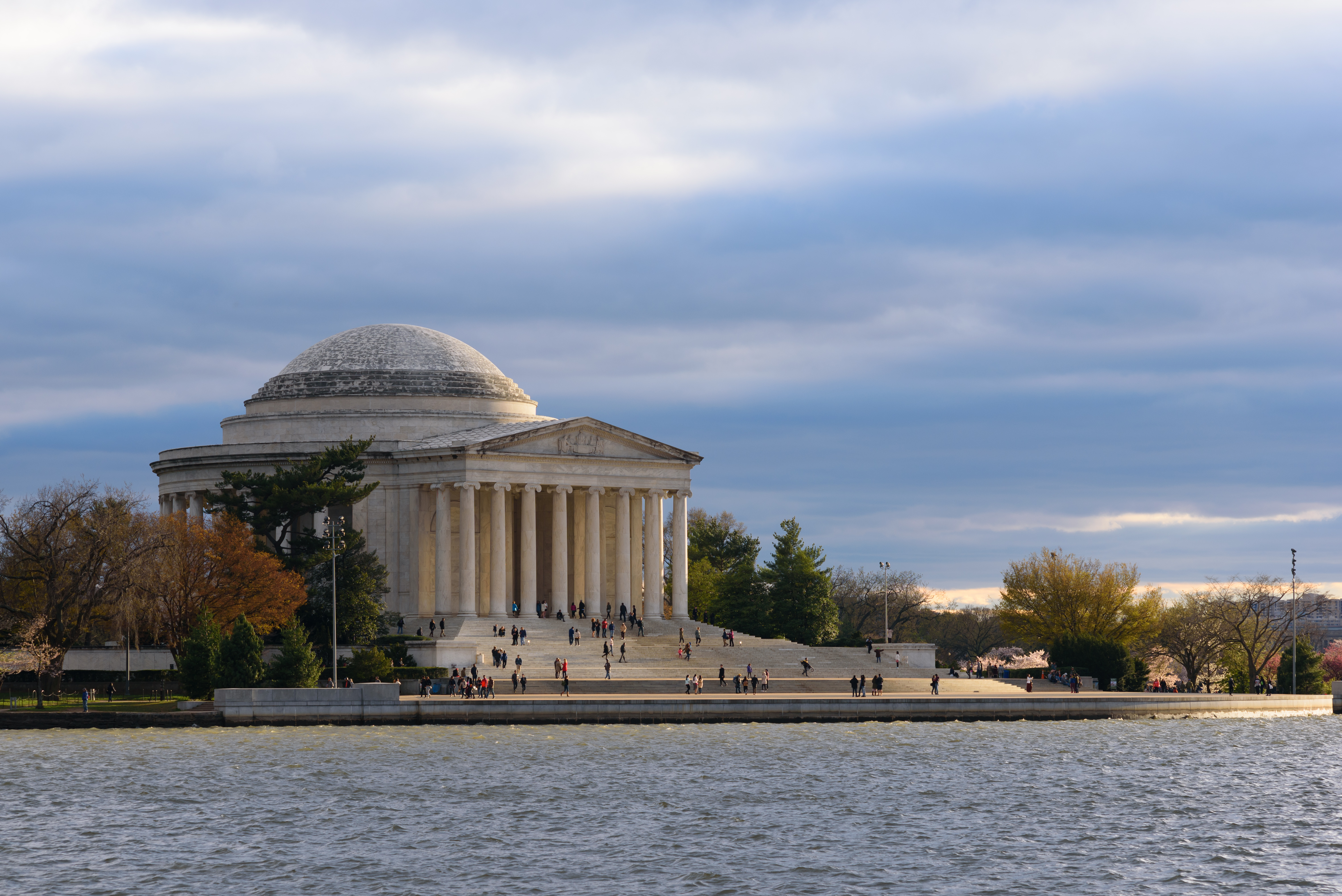
The Jefferson Memorial's exterior

The Jefferson Memorial sits on filled land within the Potomac River that, in the late 19th century, was used as a beach. The site was appealing at least partly because it was located directly south of, and in view of, the White House. In 1901, the Senate Park Commission was established to create a plan for Washington, D.C.'s park system, later to become the McMillan Plan. The commission proposed building a Pantheon-like structure on the site to host "the statues of the illustrious men of the nation". This structure, if built, would have been accompanied by six larger structures. Congress took no action on the commission's recommendation.

The completion of the Tidal Basin Inlet Bridge in 1908 helped facilitate and expand recreational usage of East and West Potomac Parks. In 1918, large liquid chlorine dispensers were installed under the bridge to treat the water, which made the Tidal Basin, also known as Twining Lake, suitable for swimming. The Tidal Basin Beach, on the site of the future Jefferson Memorial, opened in May 1918, operating as a "Whites Only" facility until 1925, when it was permanently closed to avoid addressing the question of whether it should be racially integrated. The same year, a design competition was held for a memorial to Theodore Roosevelt. The winning design, submitted by John Russell Pope, consisted of a semicircular memorial situated next to a circular basin. Like the McMillan Plan, this was never funded by Congress or acted upon.

=== 1930s proposal ===
==== Plans proceed ====
Jefferson Memorial
- Long title: Joint resolution authorizing the creation of a Federal Memorial Commission to consider and formulate plans for the construction on the apex block, Constitution and Pennsylvania Avenues, in the city of Washington, D.C., of a permanent memorial to the memory of Thomas Jefferson, third President of the United States and author of the Declaration of Independence.
- Enacted by: the 73rd United States Congress
- Effective: June 26, 1934

Citations
- Statutes at Large: 48 Stat. 1243

Legislative history
- Introduced in the House as H.J. Res. 371 by John J. Boylan (D–NY) on June 13, 1934; Committee consideration by Joint Library; Passed the House on June 16, 1934; Passed the Senate on June 16, 1934; Signed into law by President Franklin D. Roosevelt on June 26, 1934

Another opportunity for the Jefferson Memorial's development emerged in 1934, when then President Franklin D. Roosevelt, who came to admire Jefferson after reading a book on Jefferson by his friend Claude G. Bowers, inquired with the Commission of Fine Arts about erecting a memorial to Jefferson. Roosevelt included plans for the Jefferson Memorial in the Federal Triangle project, which was then under construction. Later the same year, Congressman John J. Boylan followed Roosevelt's lead, urging Congress to create the Thomas Jefferson Memorial Commission to explore the memorial's development.

The organization was established on April 12, 1935—the day before Jefferson's 192nd birthday—with Boylan as the Commission's first chairman. At the time, the Commission was tentatively considering a memorial building to Jefferson opposite the National Mall from the National Archives Building, as well as a monument to Jefferson halfway between the two structures. In conjunction, the original manuscript of the United States Declaration of Independence was to be moved to a new monument in the National Archives Building, forming a straight line of three memorials. The Commission chose John Russell Pope, the new National Archives Building's designer, as architect for the Jefferson Memorial.

Pope prepared four different plans for the project, each on a different site. One was on the Anacostia River at the end of East Capitol Street; one at Lincoln Park; one on the south side of the National Mall across from the National Archives administration building; and one was situated on the Tidal Basin, directly south of the White House. The Commission preferred the site on the Tidal Basin mainly because it was the most prominent site of those proposed and completed the four-point plan called for by the McMillan Commission, which encompassed the region including the Lincoln Memorial to the Capitol and from the White House to the Tidal Basin site. Pope designed a large pantheon-like structure designed to be situated on a square platform, flanked by two smaller, rectangular, colonnaded buildings.

==== Funding and authorization ====
Pope had died in 1937 and his surviving partners, Daniel P. Higgins and Otto R. Eggers, assumed leadership for the Jefferson Memorial's construction. The Thomas Jefferson Memorial Commission supported the pantheon-like structure, but the Commission of Fine Arts wanted the design to be "more open in character", with more horizontal design emphases and greater similarities to the White House. At the request of the Commission of Fine Arts, a slightly more conservative design for the memorial was agreed upon. The memorial's cost was approximately $3 million. Congress eventually appropriated this amount for the Jefferson Memorial, including $500,000 in its deficiency bill of June 1938.

=== Construction ===
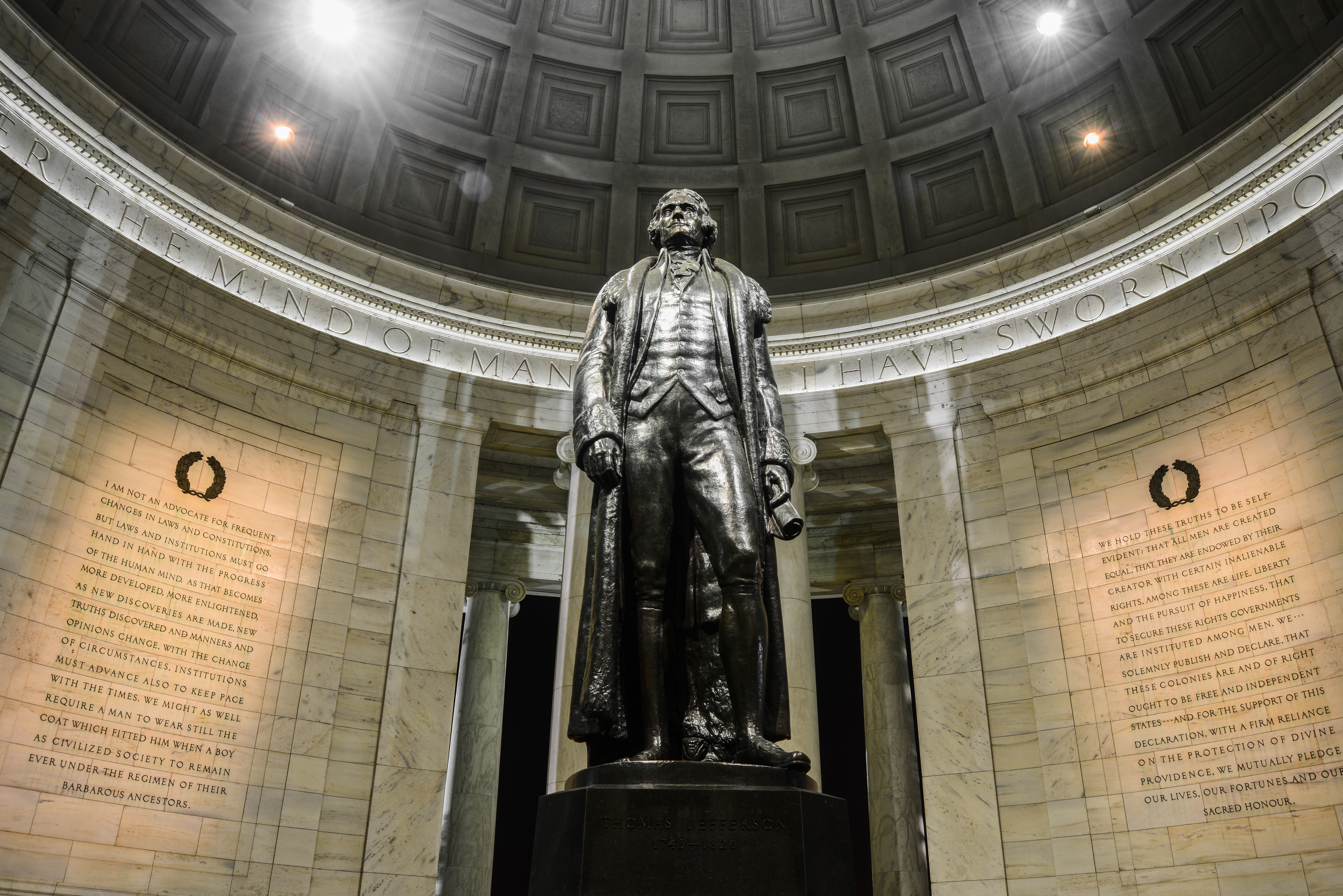
The Jefferson Memorial's interior

Construction proceeded amid some opposition. The Commission of Fine Arts never actually approved any design for the memorial and even published a pamphlet in 1939 opposing both the proposed design and site for the memorial. Additionally, some Washingtonians opposed the proposed location for it because it did not align with L'Enfant's original plan for the city, and many established elm and cherry trees, including rare stock donated by Japan in 1912, would be removed under the memorial's original plan. Construction continued amid the opposition, which included women protestors chaining themselves to cherry trees around the construction site in November 1938. Opposition to the memorial proved dismaying to Roosevelt, but the opposition diminished notably once revised plans identified a means for maintaining the surrounding cherry trees amidst the memorial's construction.

Construction on the Jefferson Memorial began December 15, 1938. The cornerstone, containing 15 volumes with all of Jefferson's publications, was laid roughly eleven months later, on November 15, 1939, by Roosevelt himself. In 1939, the Memorial Commission hosted a competition to select a sculptor for the planned Jefferson statue to be placed in the center of the memorial. They received 101 entries and chose six finalists. Of the six, Rudulph Evans was chosen as the main sculptor, and Adolph A. Weinman was chosen to sculpt the pediment relief situated above the memorial's entrance.

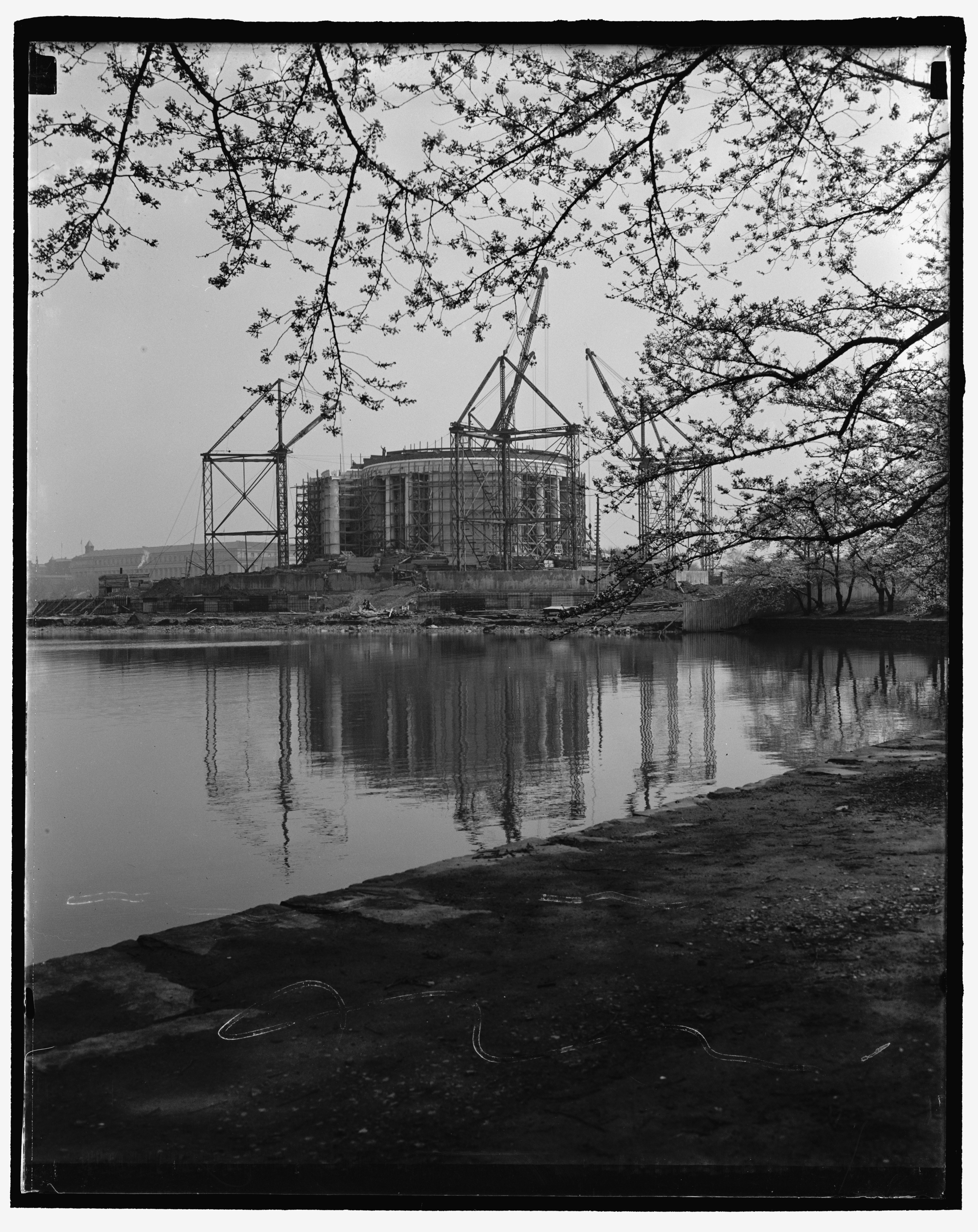
The Jefferson Memorial's construction as seen from across the left side of the Tidal Basin in 1940

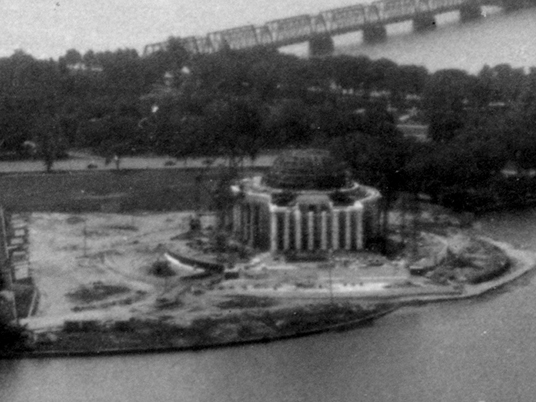
The Jefferson Memorial's construction as seen from the top of the Washington Monument in 1940

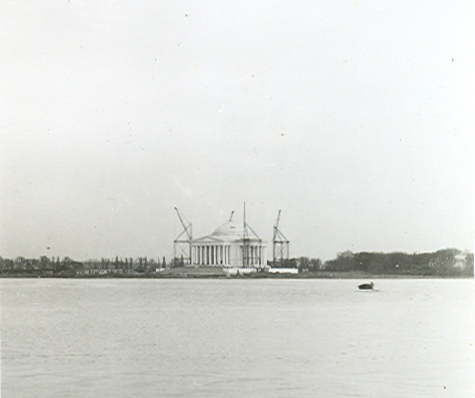
The Jefferson Memorial's construction as seen from across the center of the Tidal Basin in May 1941

Landscape architect Frederick Law Olmsted Jr. designed the memorial landscape, which featured a simple design within a circular driveway including primarily Evergreen trees with limited flowering trees or shrubs. The design was perceived as too thin, so white pines and some other plantings were later added before the memorial's dedication in 1943.

=== Opening and subsequent history ===
On April 13, 1943, the 200th anniversary of Jefferson's birthday, the Jefferson Memorial was officially dedicated and opened by Roosevelt. At the time, Evans' statue had not yet been finished due to material shortages that emerged during World War II. Instead, the memorial opened with a temporary plaster cast statue similar to the bronze statue that Evans completed four years later. The statue's cast was developed by Roman Bronze Works in New York City. The statue was ultimately installed inside the memorial in April 1947. The ground around the monument began to visibly sag in the years after it was completed.

In the 1970s, nearly three decades after the memorial's opening, additional changes to Olmsted's landscaping were implemented. But in 1993 and 2000, attempts to restore the integrity of Olmsted's initial design were made. Roosevelt ordered trees be cut so that the Jefferson Memorial was clearly visible from the White House; additional tree pruning was also completed to create an unobstructed view between the Jefferson Memorial and Lincoln Memorial.

By the 2000s, the grounds were sinking, and part of the seawall surrounding the monument was falling into the Tidal Basin, despite efforts over the years to shore up the monument. Water regularly flooded over the seawall at high tide by the 2020s, sometimes reaching the monument, prompting a reconstruction of the seawall.

== Site ==
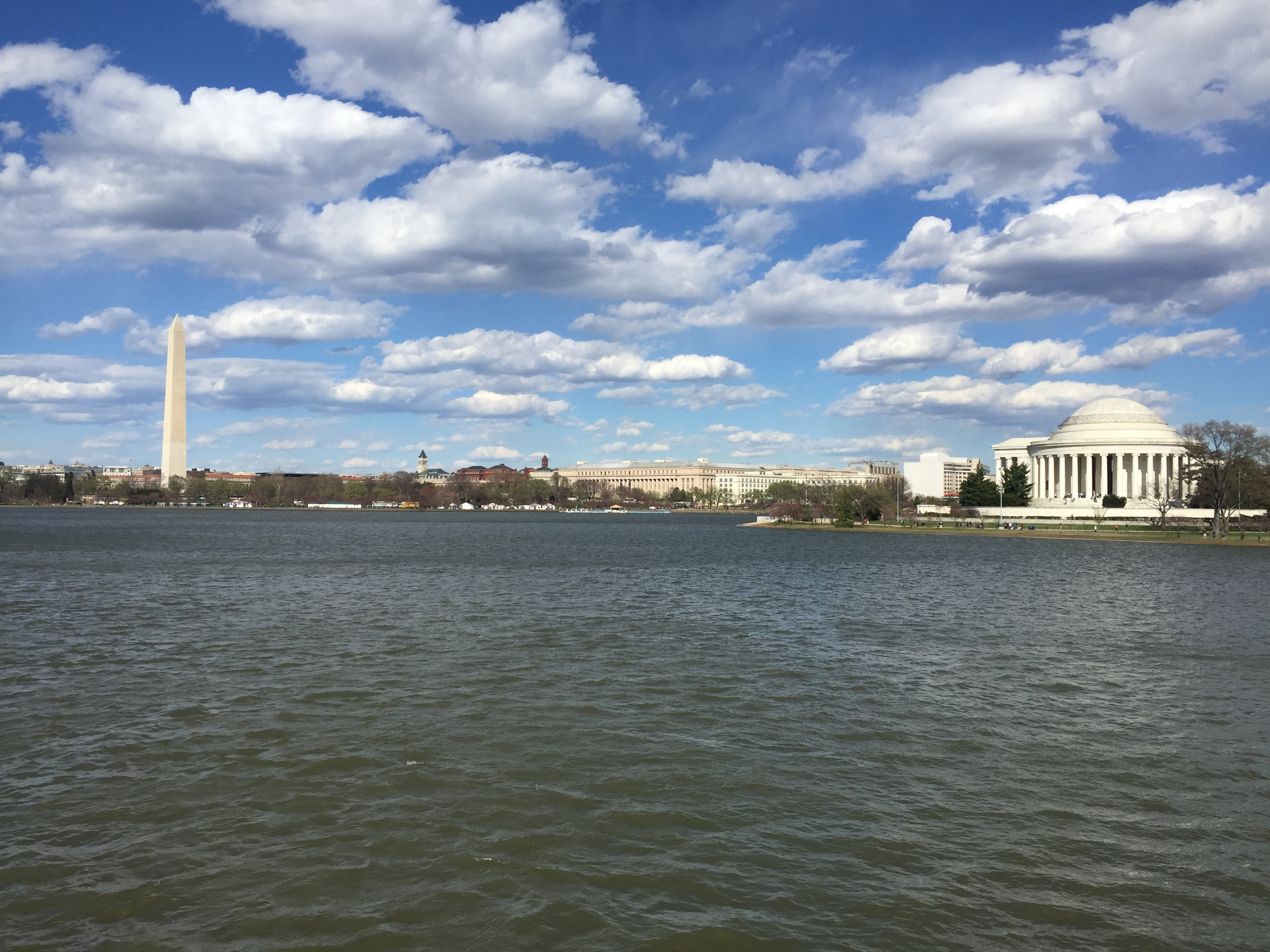
The Washington Monument (left) and Jefferson Memorial (right) with the Tidal Basin in the foreground

The monument is located in West Potomac Park in Washington, D.C.. It sits on the shore of the Potomac River's Tidal Basin, which borders the monument to the west and north; ramps from the 14th Street Bridges surround it on the other two sides. Because the monument sits on filled land, it is supported by deep foundations that extend 90 feet (27 m) deep. The park is enhanced with the massed planting of Japanese cherry blossom trees, which predated the memorial's construction and were a 1912 gift from the people of Japan.

The Jefferson Memorial is located exactly south of the White House. The north–south axis through the Jefferson Memorial and White House, and the west–east axis through the Lincoln Memorial and National Mall, were originally intended to converge at the Washington Monument. The Washington Monument was built farther east because the ground at that location was deemed too soft and swampy. The Jefferson Memorial also lies approximately on the same axis as Maryland Avenue across the Tidal Basin, which continues northeast.

Although the Jefferson Memorial is geographically removed from other buildings and monuments in Washington, D.C., the National Mall, and Washington Metro, the memorial plays host to many events and ceremonies each year, including memorial exercises, the Easter Sunrise Service, and the annual National Cherry Blossom Festival, and ranks highly among destinations for visitors to the city each year.

== Description and features ==
=== Exterior ===
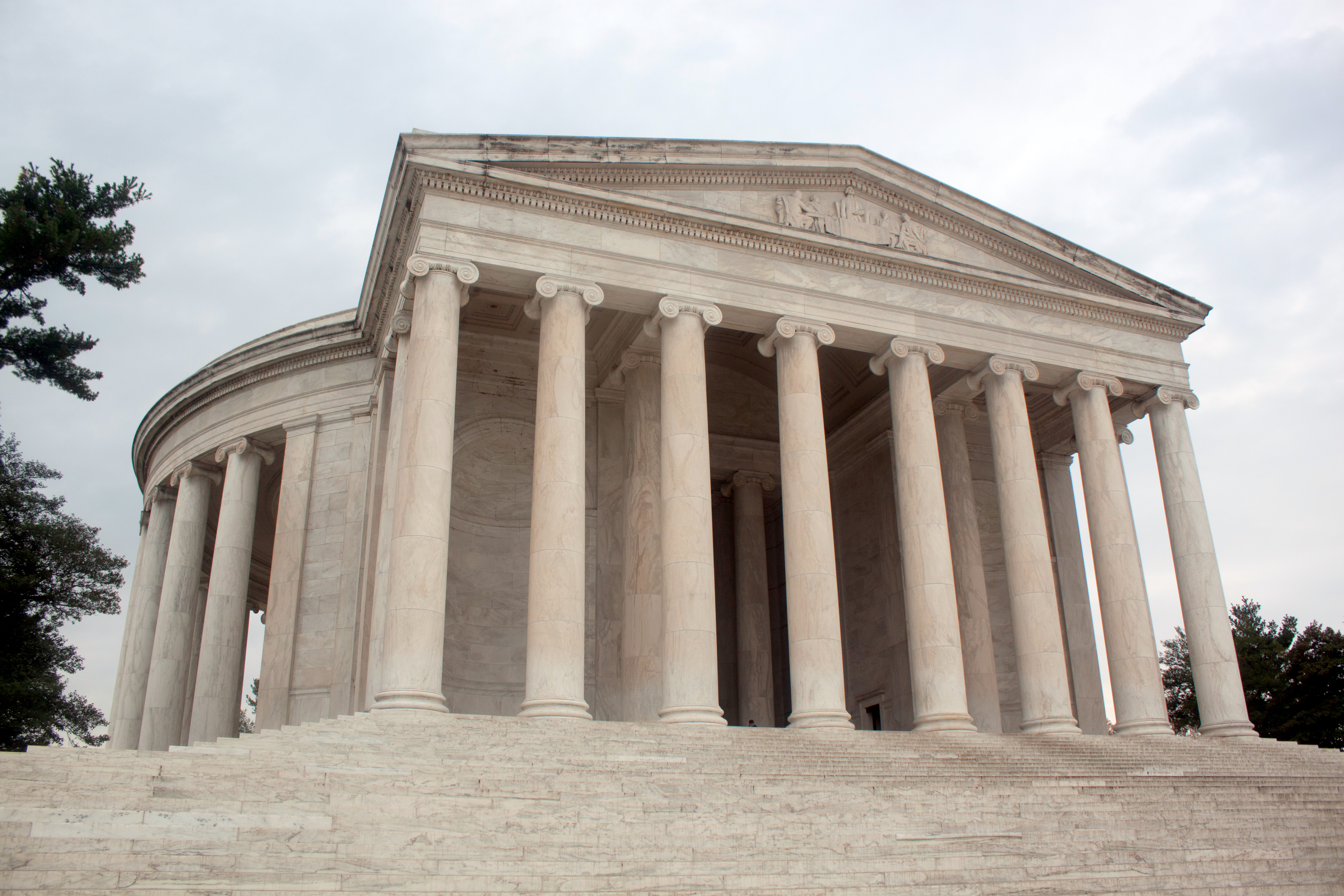
The monument's marble steps, portico, circular colonnade of ionic order columns, and shallow dome

The Jefferson Memorial is composed of circular marble steps, a portico, a circular colonnade of Ionic order columns, and a shallow dome. The building is open to the elements. It has a diameter of approximately 165 feet (50 m). Each of the 26 columns is 14 feet (4.3 m) high and measures 5 feet 3 inches (1.60 m) in diameter. The bays between each column are 6 3/4 feet (2.1 m) wide.

The memorial is constructed with white Imperial Danby marble taken from Vermont, which rests on a series of granite and marble-stepped terraces. A flight of granite and marble stairs and platforms, flanked by granite buttresses, leads up to the memorial from the Tidal Basin to a portico with a triangular pediment. The front of the portico is seven bays wide (interspersed between eight columns), while the sides are two bays wide.

The pediment features a sculpture by Adolph Alexander Weinman depicting the Committee of Five, the five members of the committee charged with drafting the U.S. Declaration of Independence. In addition to Jefferson, who was the primary author, committee members included John Adams, Benjamin Franklin, Robert R. Livingston, and Roger Sherman. A cornice with an egg and dart molding surrounds this pediment, and below that is a plain frieze.

=== Interior ===
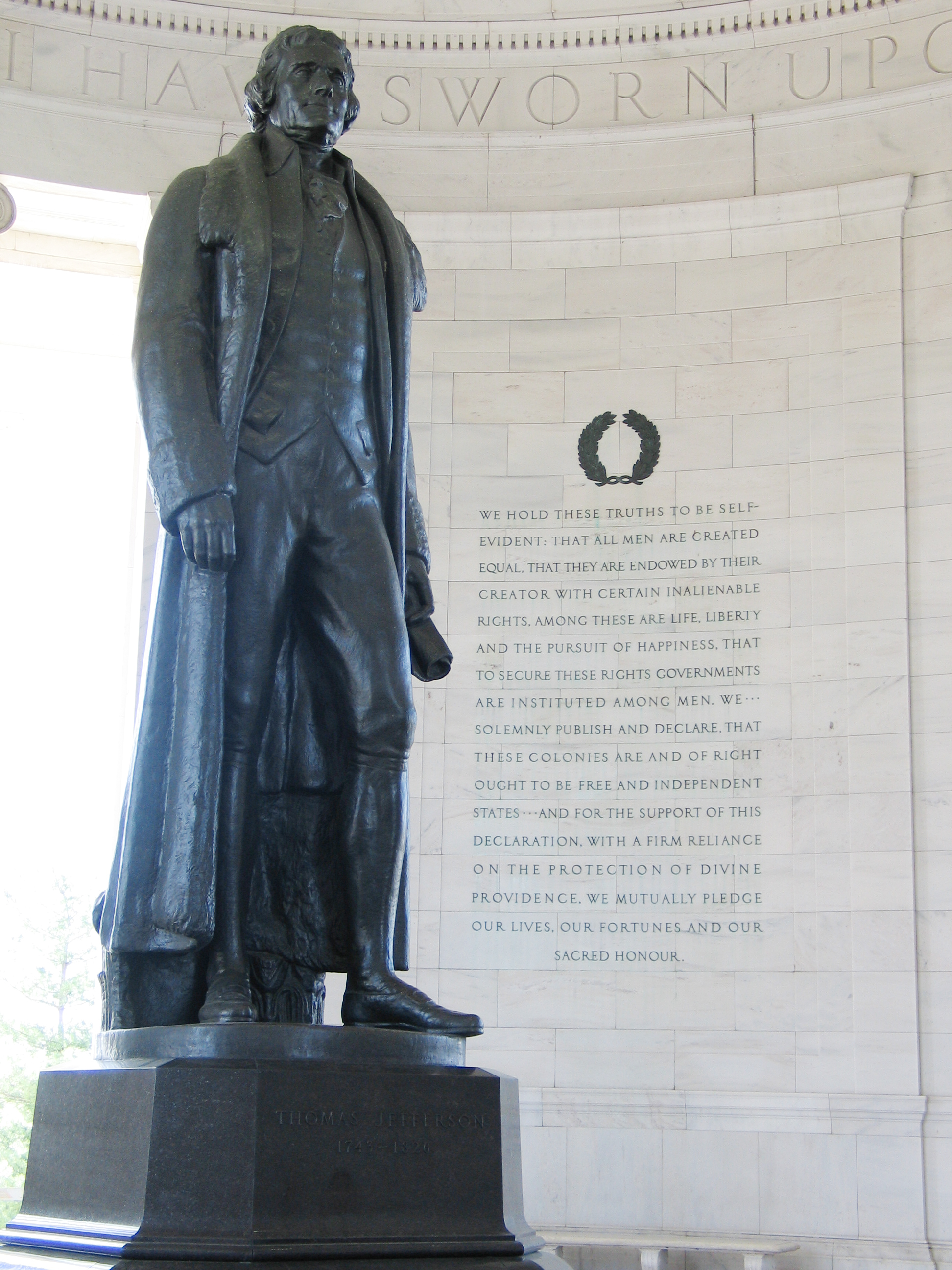
Rudulph Evans's statue of Thomas Jefferson in front of excerpts from the Declaration of Independence, a document Jefferson principally authored and which historian Joseph Ellis has described as "the most potent and consequential words in U.S history."

The memorial's interior is made of Georgia white marble. It has a 19 feet (5.8 m) tall, 10,000 lb (4,500 kg) bronze statue of Jefferson developed by sculptor Rudulph Evans. The statue was added four years after the dedication. Among many Jefferson quotes inside the memorial, one of the most prominently situated are those inscribed in the frieze below the dome: "I have sworn upon the altar of God eternal hostility against every form of tyranny over the mind of man." This sentence is taken from a letter written by Jefferson on September 23, 1800, to Benjamin Rush in which Jefferson defends the constitutional refusal to recognize a state religion.

A lower level of the structure contains a gift shop and a museum focusing on Jefferson's life and political career.

==== Inscribed panels ====
Four panels in the memorial bear inscribed quotations. On the panel of the southwest interior wall are excerpts from the United States Declaration of Independence:

We hold these truths to be self-evident: that all men are created equal, that they are endowed by their Creator with certain inalienable rights, among these are life, liberty, and the pursuit of happiness, that to secure these rights governments are instituted among men. We...solemnly publish and declare, that these colonies are and of right ought to be free and independent states...And for the support of this declaration, with a firm reliance on the protection of divine providence, we mutually pledge our lives, our fortunes, and our sacred honor.

The inscription uses the word "inalienable", as appears in Jefferson's draft rather than "unalienable" as ultimately appeared in the final Declaration.

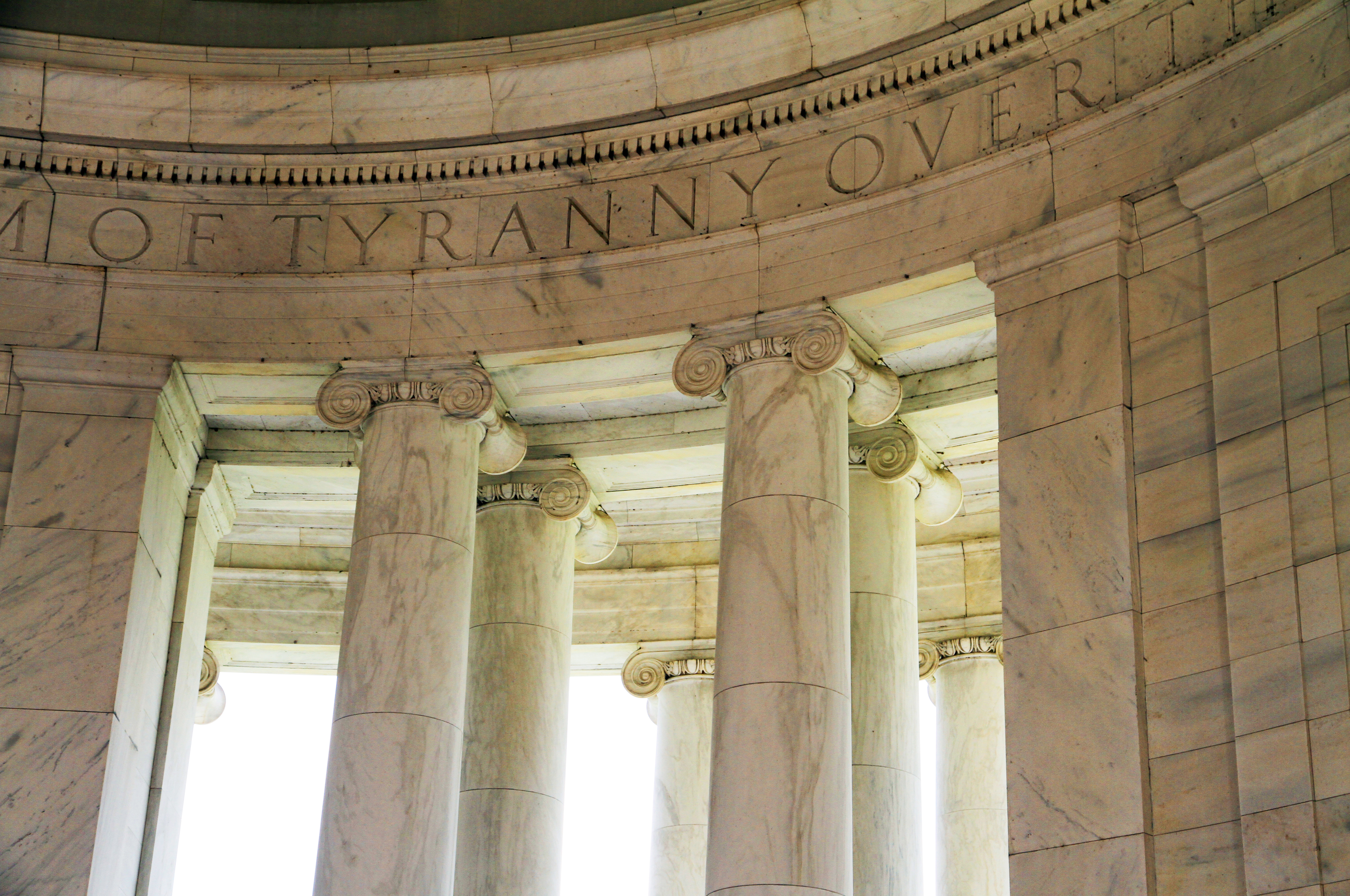
The interior columns and walls

On the panel of the northwest interior wall is a quote from the 1777 Virginia Statute for Religious Freedom, which excludes the quote's final sentence and is taken from an August 28, 1789, letter Jefferson wrote to James Madison:

Almighty God hath created the mind free...All attempts to influence it by temporal punishments or burthens...are a departure from the plan of the Holy Author of our religion...No man shall be compelled to frequent or support any religious worship or ministry or shall otherwise suffer on account of his religious opinions or belief, but all men shall be free to profess and by argument to maintain, their opinions in matters of religion. I know but one code of morality for men whether acting singly or collectively.

The Jefferson quotes from the panel on the northeast interior wall come from multiple sources. The first, which begins "God who gave us life gave us liberty" is from A Summary View of the Rights of British America. The second, third, and fourth sentences are from Notes on the State of Virginia. The fifth quote, which begins "Nothing is more certainly written in the book of fate than that these people are to be free" is from Jefferson's autobiography. The sixth sentence, beginning "Establish the law...", is from a letter of August 13, 1786, to George Wythe. The final sentence is from a letter of January 4, 1786, to George Washington:

God who gave us life gave us liberty. Can the liberties of a nation be secure when we have removed a conviction that these liberties are the gift of God? Indeed I tremble for my country when I reflect that God is just, that his justice cannot sleep forever. Commerce between master and slave is despotism. Nothing is more certainly written in the book of fate than these people are to be free. Establish the law for educating the common people. This it is the business of the state to effect and on a general plan.

The inscription on the panel of the southeast interior wall is excerpted from Jefferson's July 12, 1816, letter to Samuel Kercheval:

I am not an advocate for frequent changes in laws and constitutions. But laws and institutions must go hand in hand with the progress of the human mind. As that becomes more developed, more enlightened, as new discoveries are made, new truths discovered and manners and opinions change, with the change of circumstances, institutions must advance also to keep pace with the times. We might as well require a man to wear still the coat which fitted him when a boy as civilized society to remain ever under the regimen of their barbarous ancestors.

== Awards and landmark designations ==
In 1944, Eggers & Higgins received the Biennial Certificate of Merit for their work on the Jefferson Memorial. On October 15, 1966, in recognition of the Jefferson Memorial's historical and artistic significance, the Jefferson Memorial was named to the National Register of Historic Places. In 2007, it ranked fourth on the "list of America's favorite architecture", published by the American Institute of Architects.

== Gallery ==
Exterior details

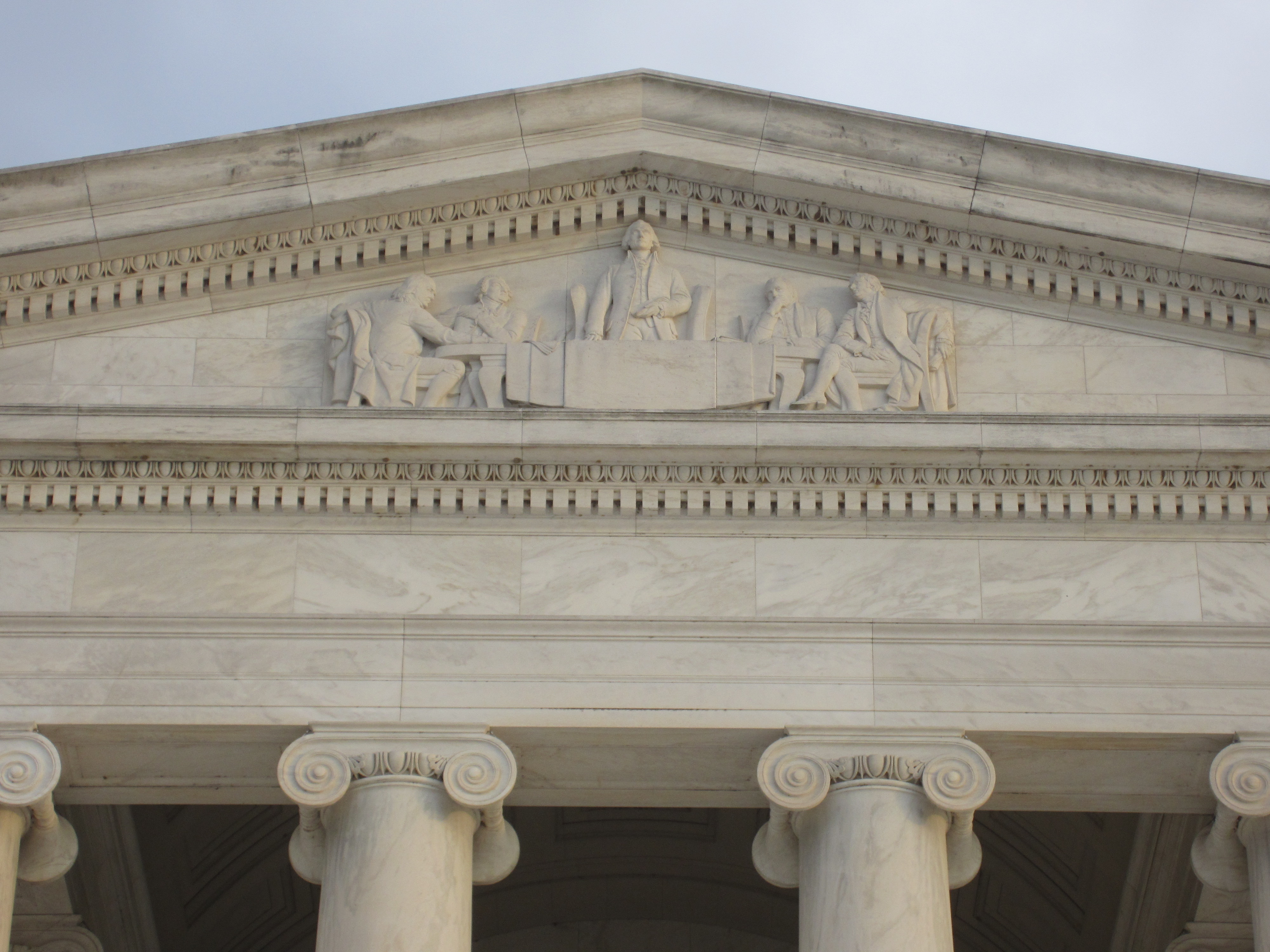
Pediment, with an Adolph Alexander Weinman sculpture of the Committee of Five

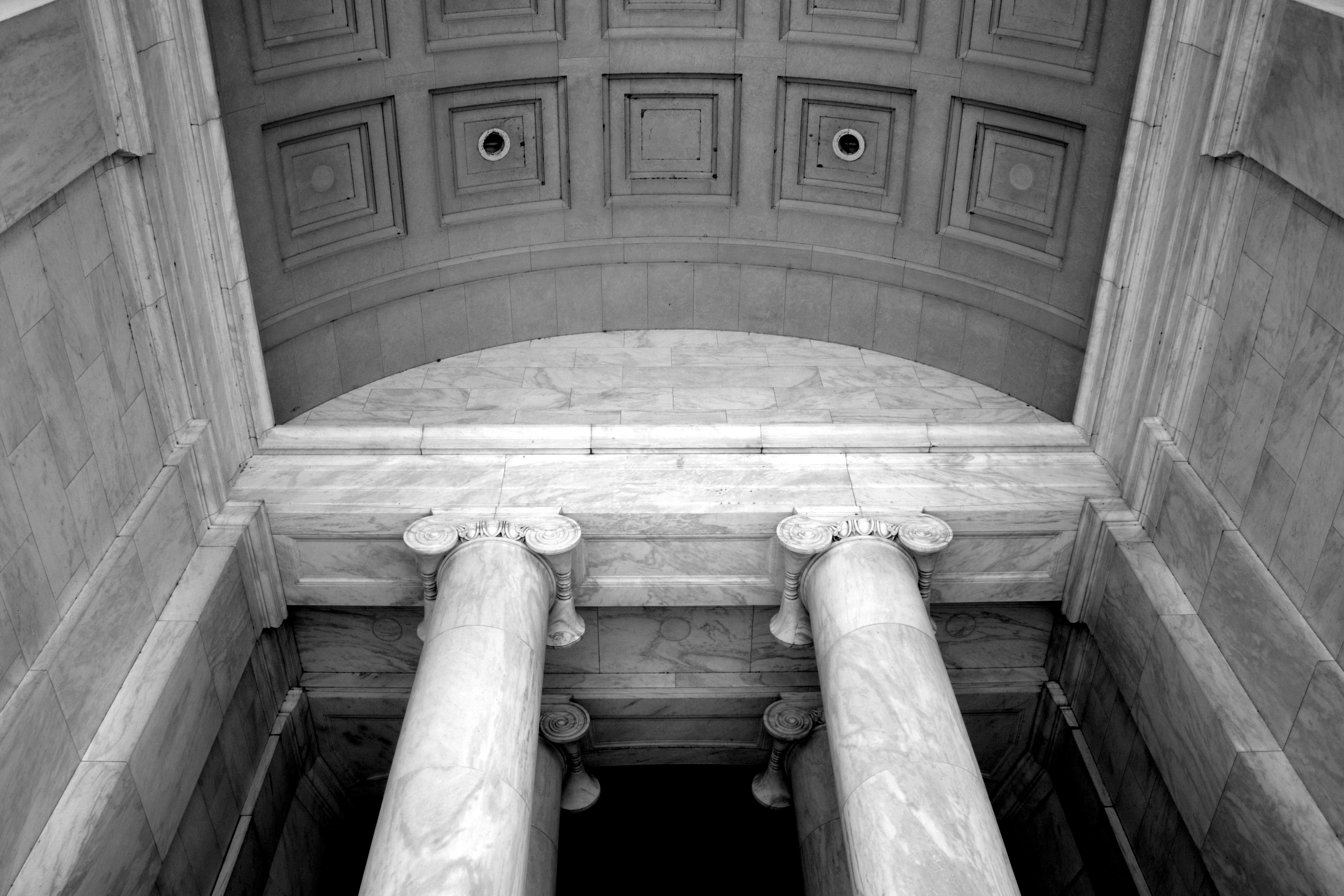
Portico ceiling

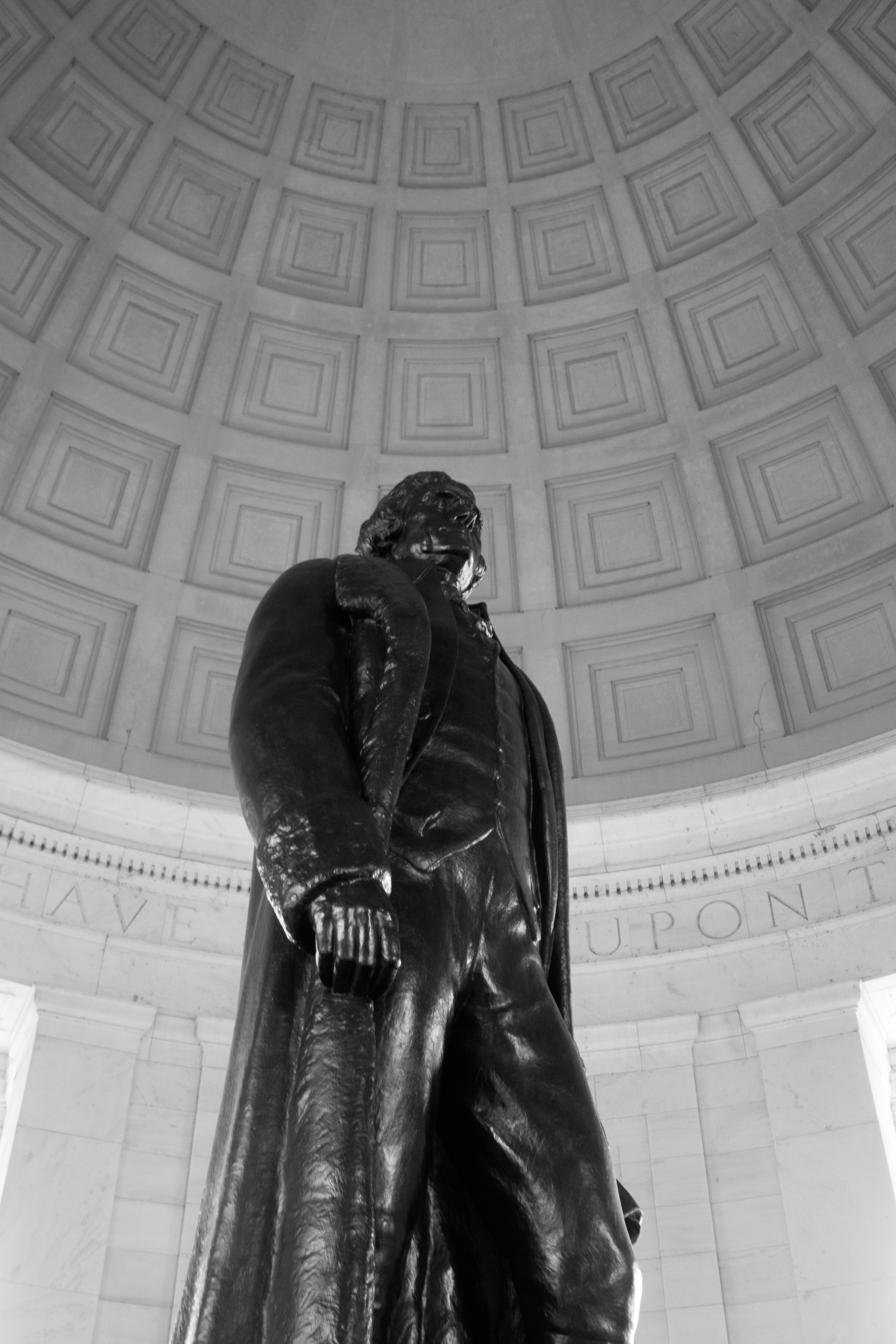
Bronze statue and dome ceiling

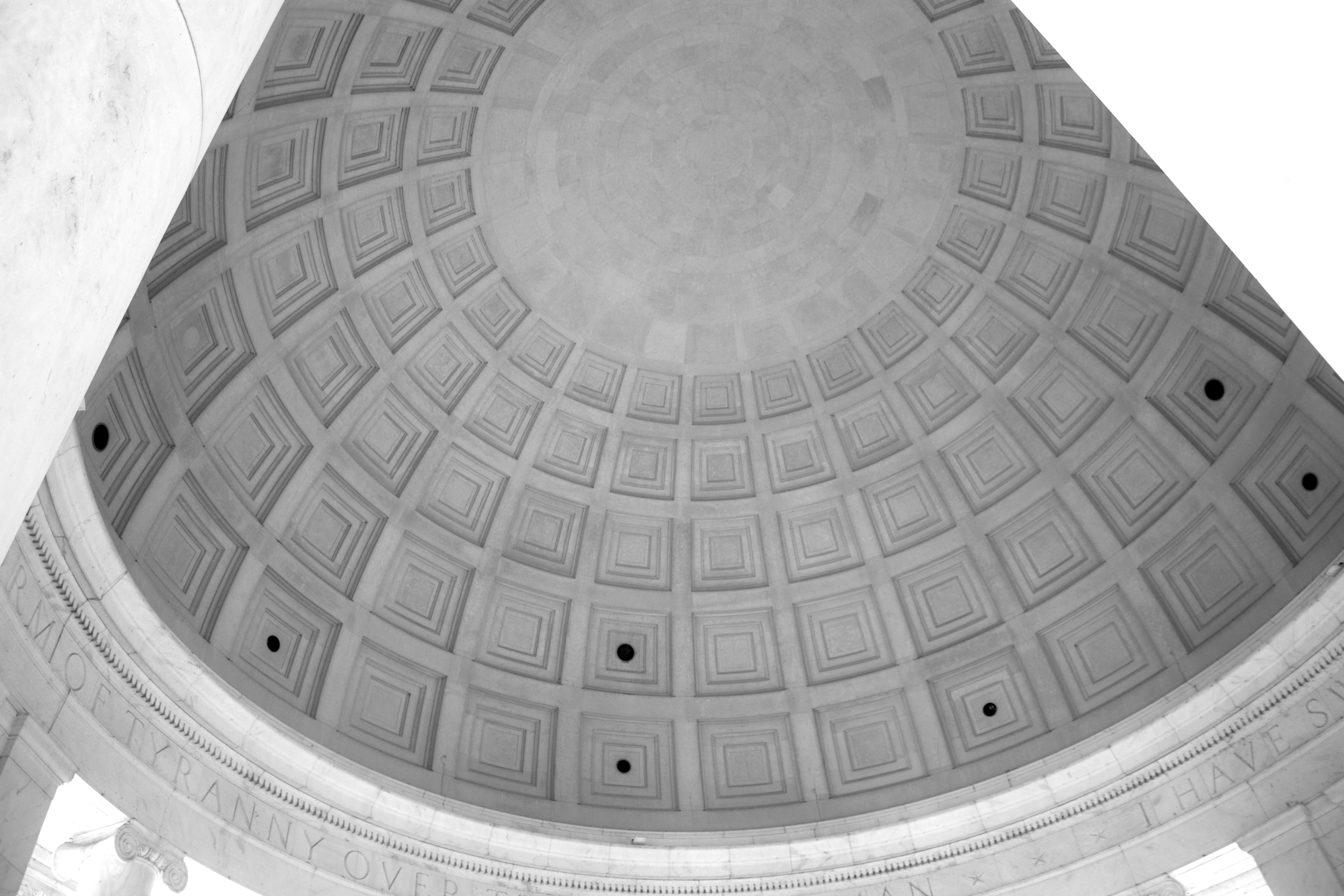
Dome ceiling and frieze

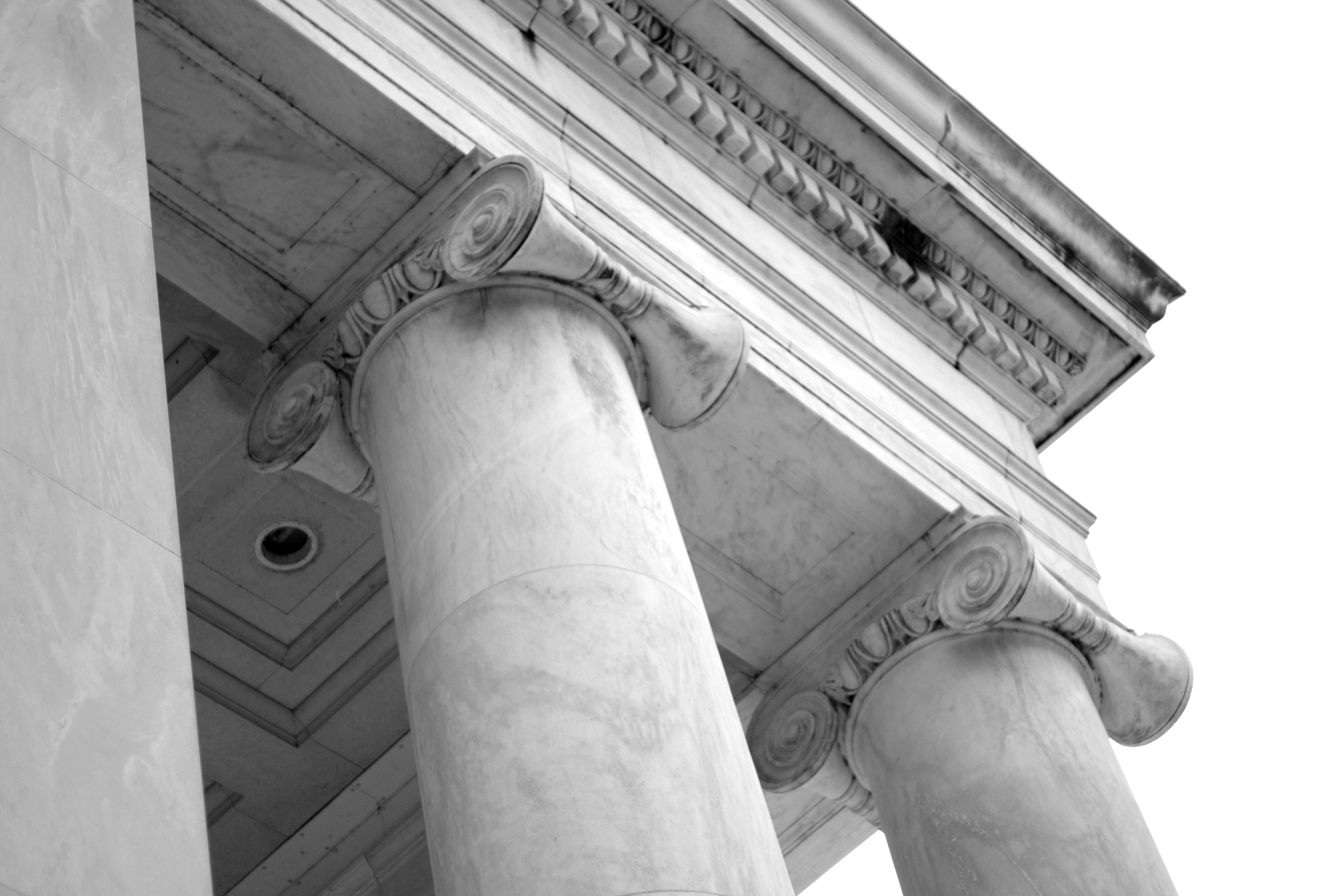
Exterior columns
Interior details

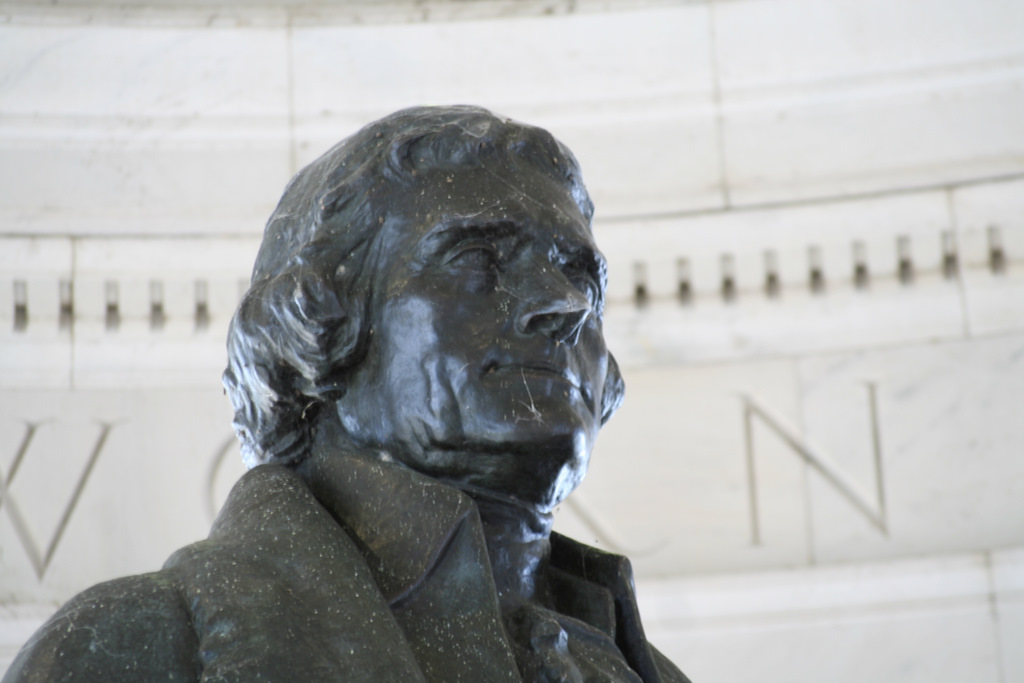
Detail of the statue's head

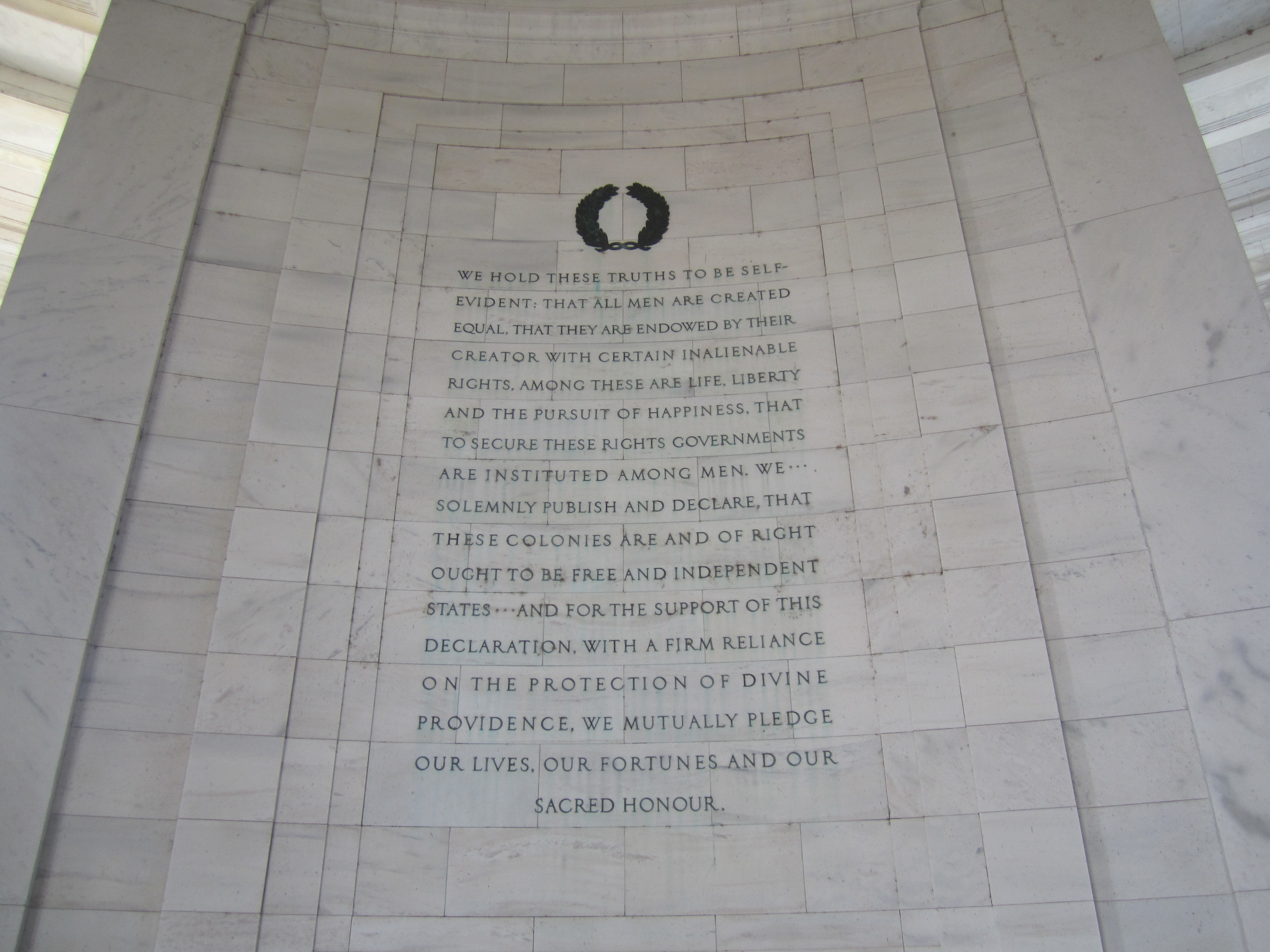
"We Hold These Truths"

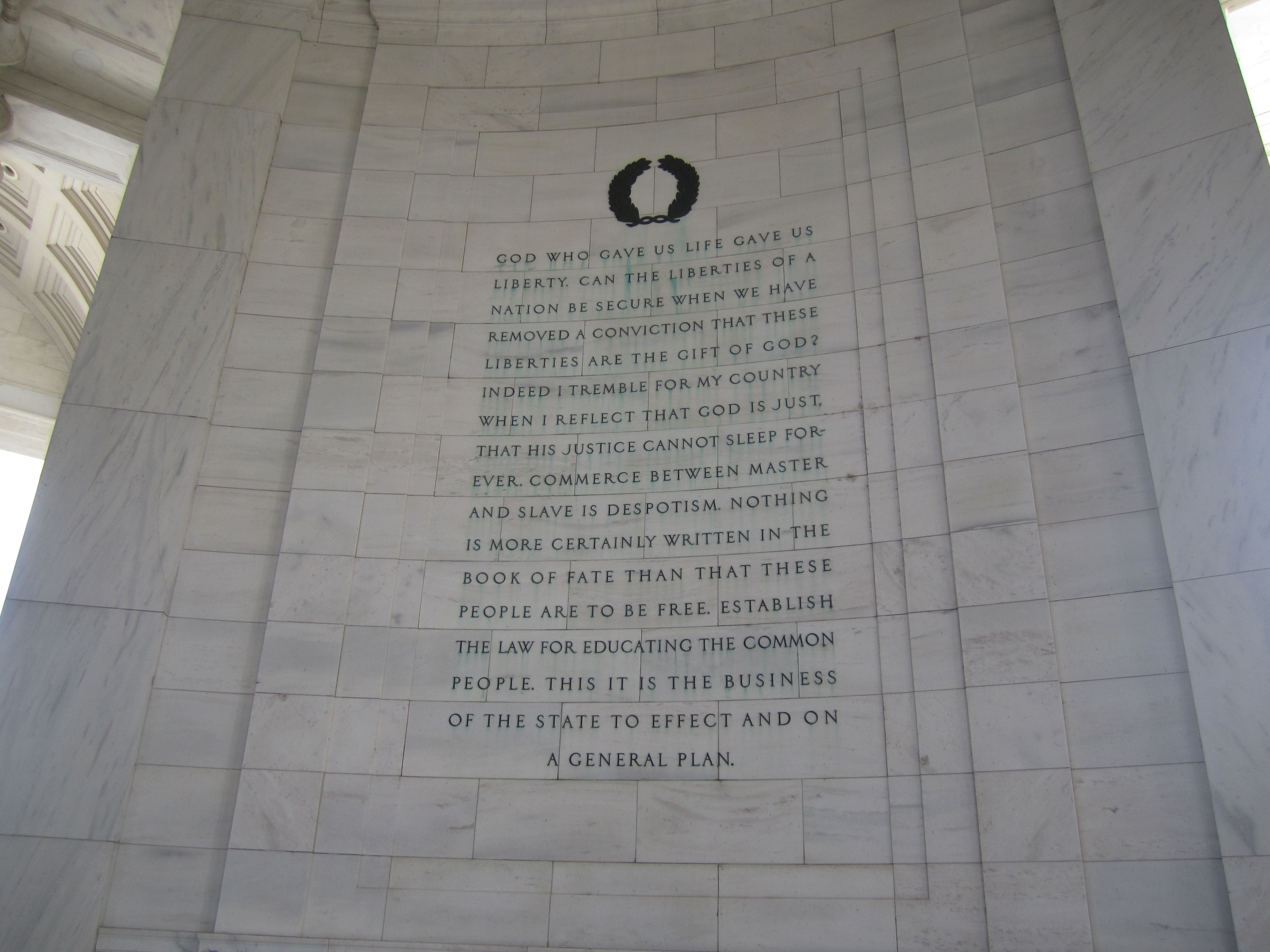
"God Who Gave Us Life"

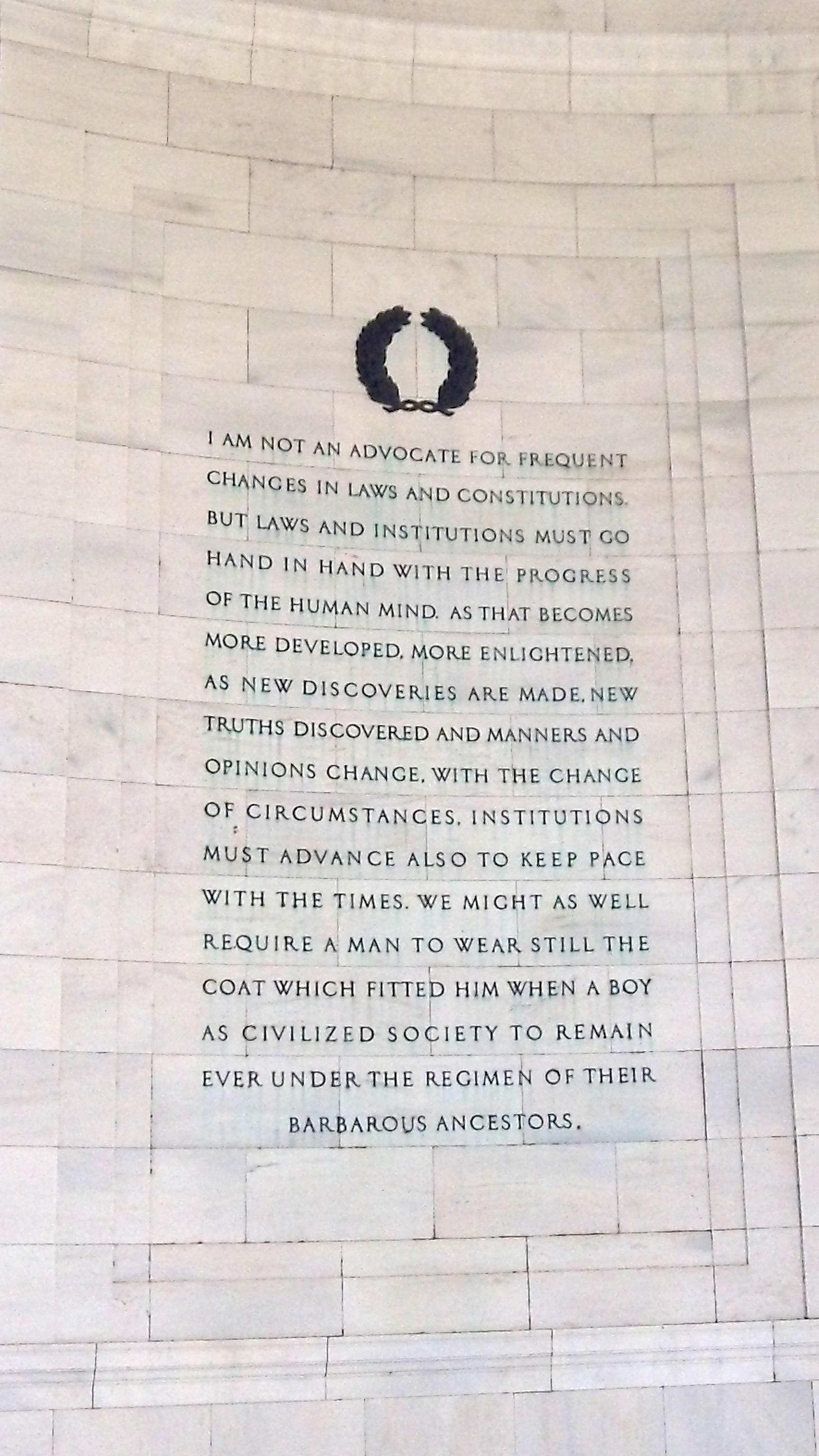
"I Am Not an Advocate for Frequent Changes..."

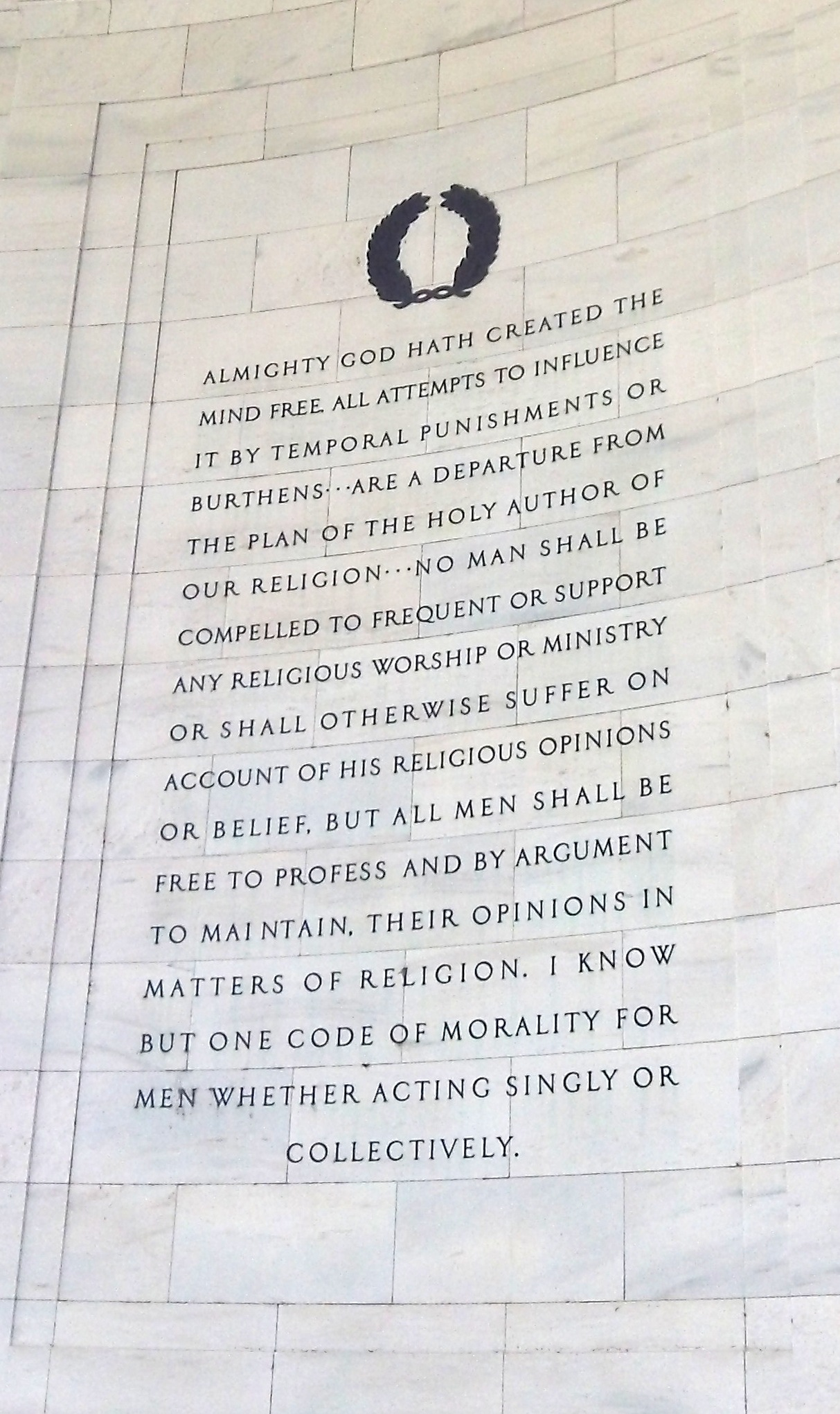
"Almighty God Hath Created the Mind Free..."
Views of the Memorial

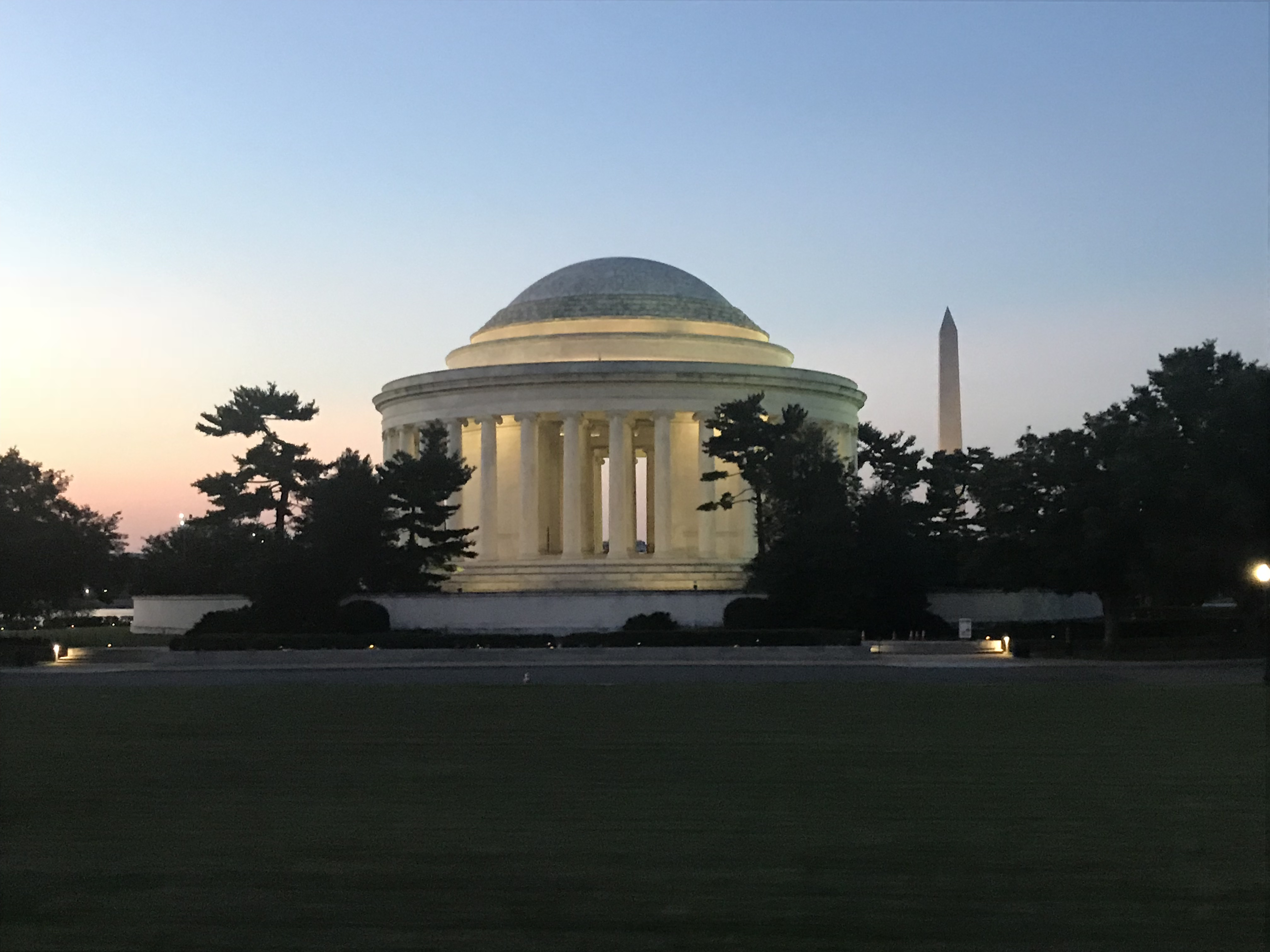
Jefferson Memorial with the Washington Monument in background

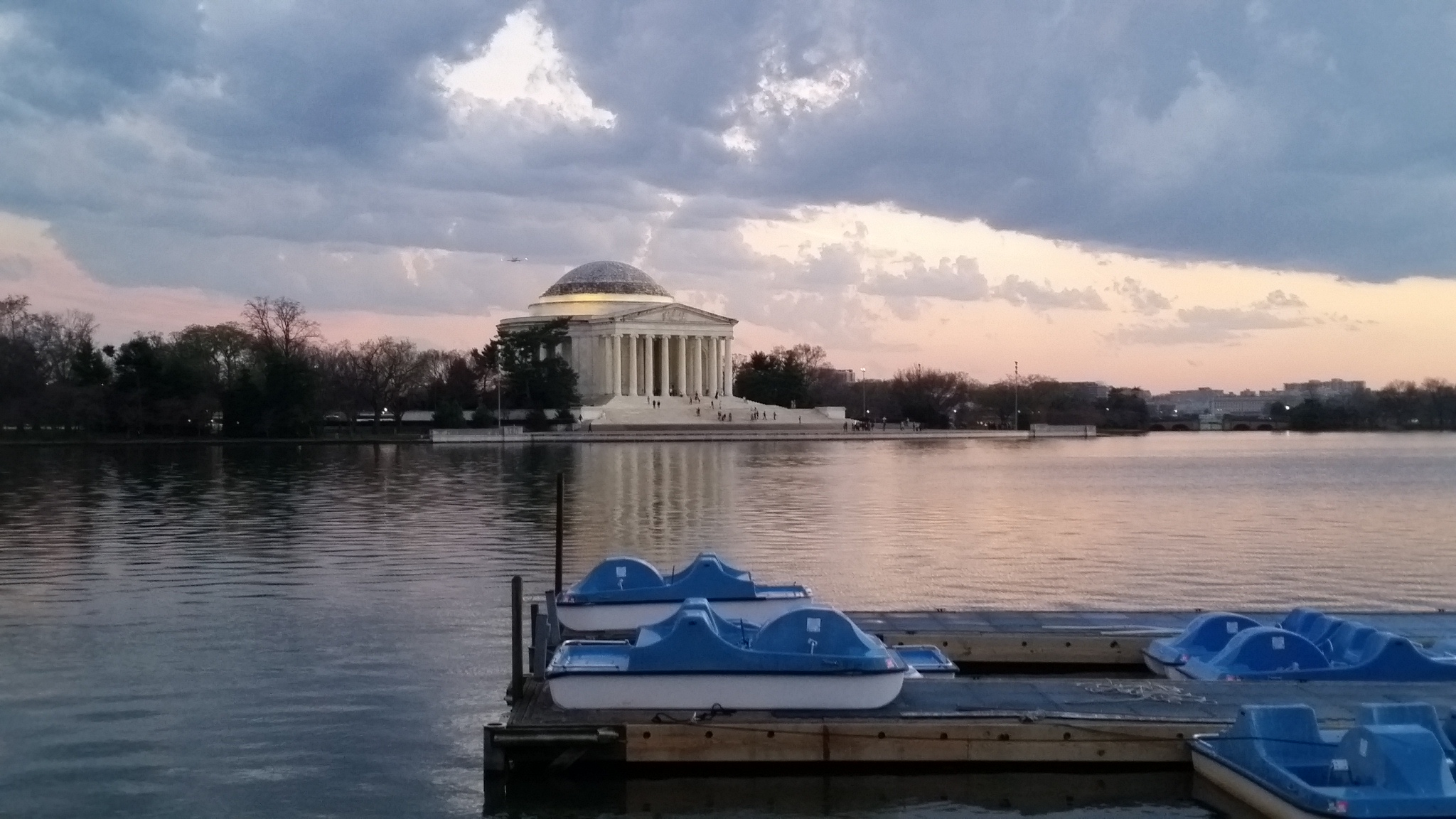
Tidal Basin view in March 2016

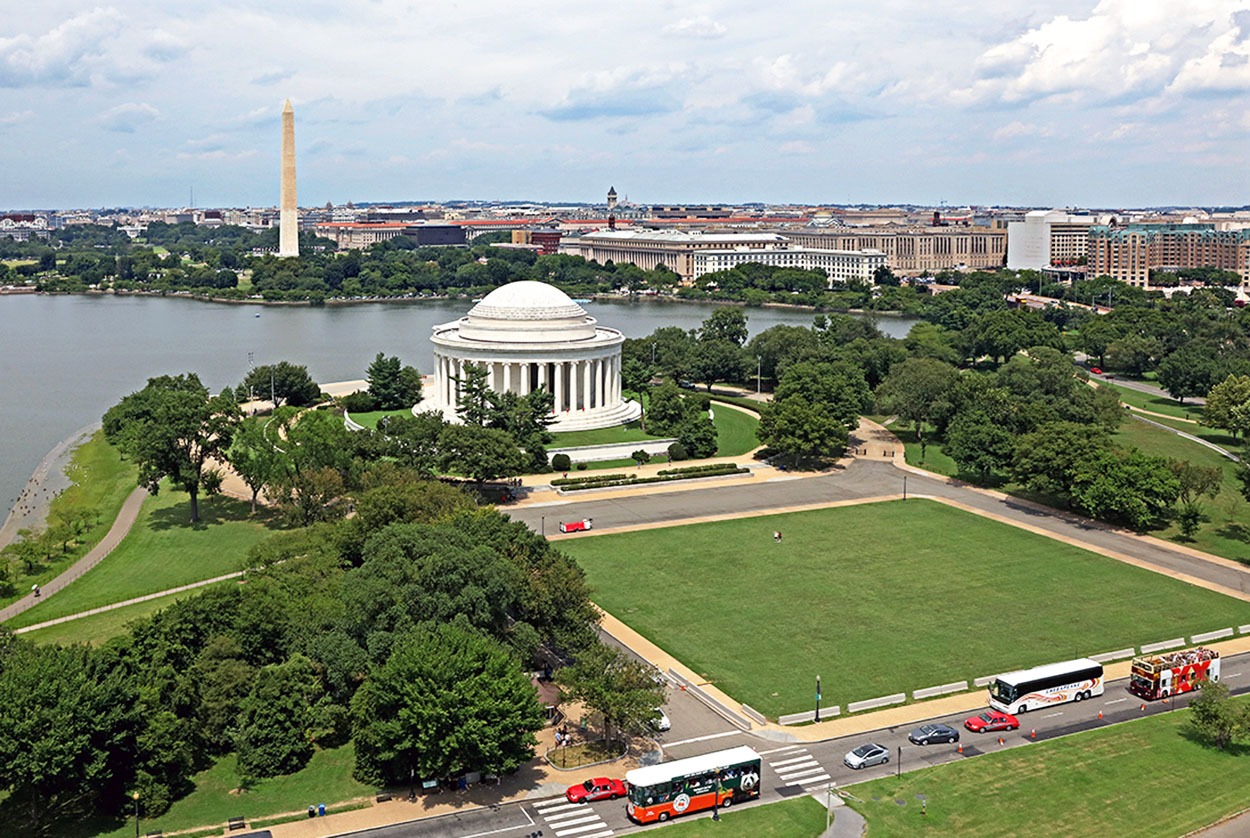
Jefferson Memorial looking Northeast

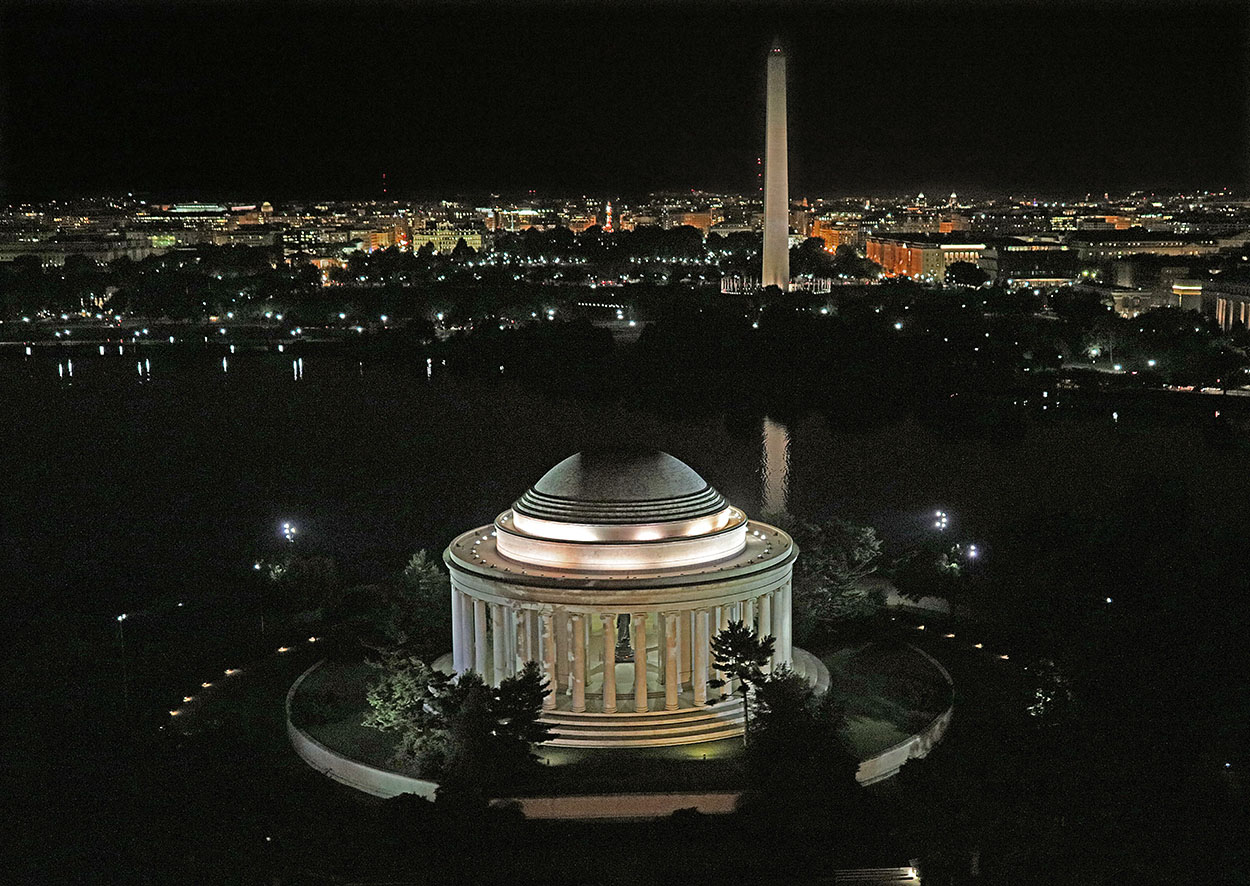
Jefferson Memorial at night

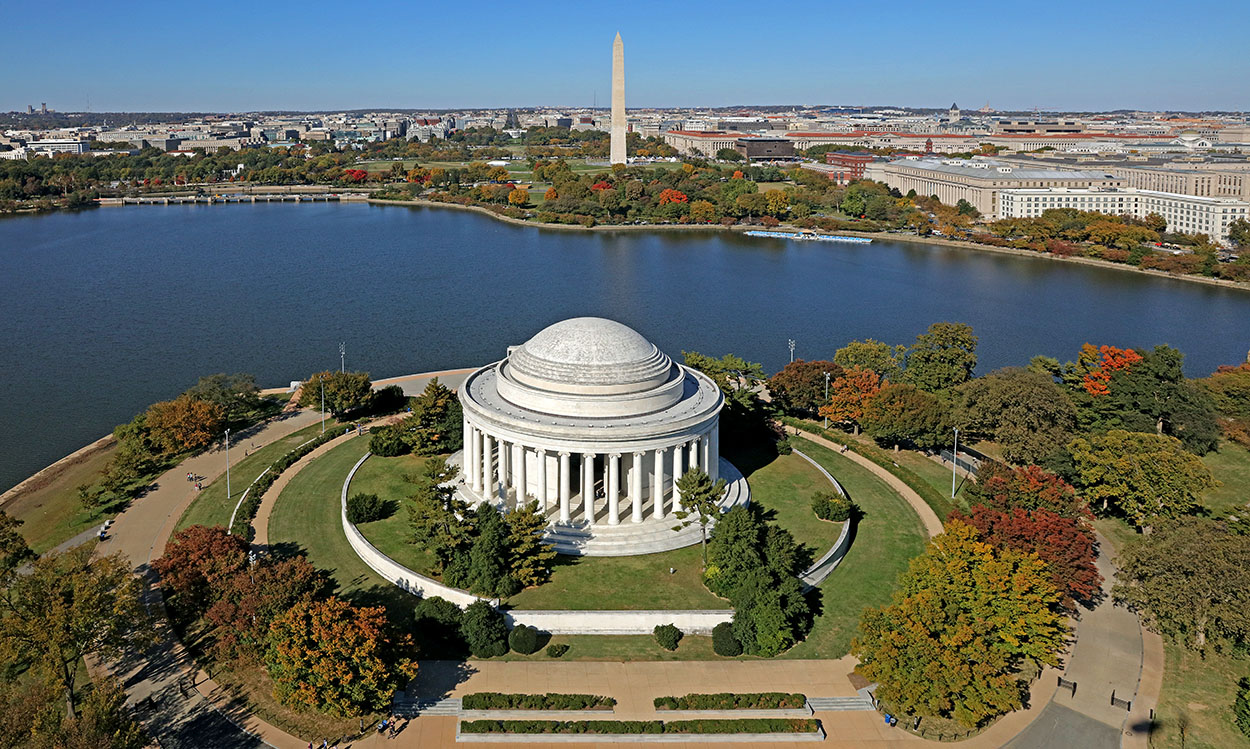
Jefferson Memorial looking North

== See also ==
- Adams Memorial (proposed)
- Architecture of Washington, D.C.
- Benjamin Franklin National Memorial
- George Mason Memorial – Memorial by Wendy M. Ross in Washington, D.C., U.S.
- James Madison Memorial Building – Building of the United States Library of Congress
- List of national memorials of the United States
- List of sculptures of presidents of the United States
- List of statues of Thomas Jefferson
- Memorial to the 56 Signers of the Declaration of Independence – Memorial in the Constitution Gardens, Washington, D.C.
- Monticello – Primary residence of U.S. Founding Father Thomas Jefferson
- Presidential memorials in the United States
- Washington Monument – U.S. national memorial in Washington, D.C.
