= John McShain =

American contractor

- Born: December 21, 1896; Philadelphia, Pennsylvania, U.S.
- Died: September 9, 1989 (aged 92); Killarney, Ireland
- Resting place: Philadelphia, Pennsylvania, U.S.
- Education: La Salle University (BA)
- Known for: "The Man Who Built Washington"
- Spouse: Mary McShain (m. 1927)
- Children: 1

John McShain (December 21, 1896 – September 9, 1989) was an American building contractor known as "The Man Who Built Washington".

Born in Philadelphia, Pennsylvania, the son of Irish immigrants, McShain graduated from St. Joseph's Preparatory School in 1918 after having attended La Salle College High School for several years. He later graduated from La Salle University, earning a bachelor's degree.

== Early life and education ==
McShain was born in Philadelphia, Pennsylvania, on December 21, 1896. His father founded a successful construction company, which he was forced to take over at age 21 following his father's death in 1919.

== Career ==
=== Construction ===
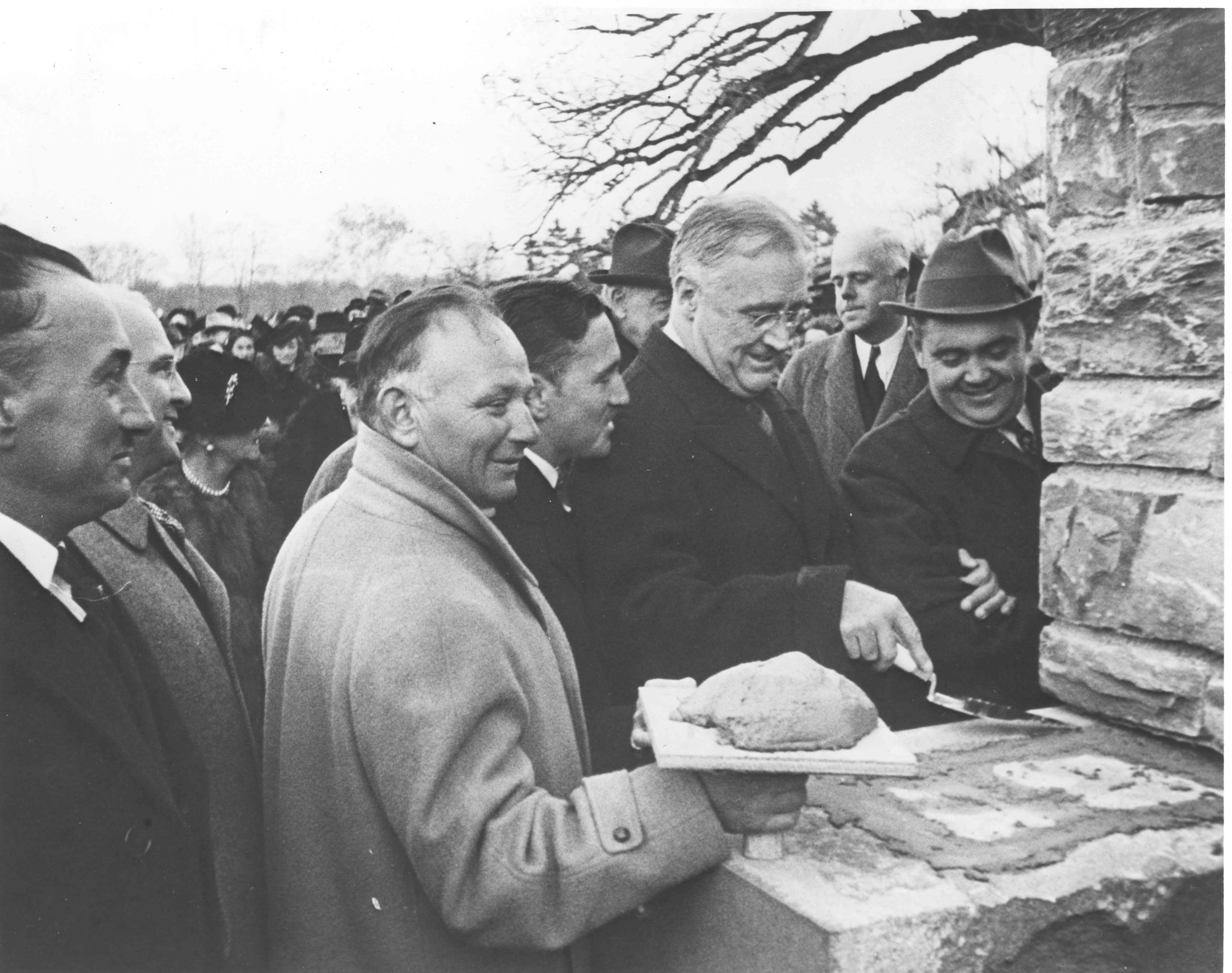
McShain to the left of President Franklin D. Roosevelt at the cornerstone laying of Franklin D. Roosevelt Library, Hyde Park, New York, November 19, 1939.

Under McShain's management, the company became one of the leading builders in the United States.

From the 1930s to the 1960s, the company worked on more than 100 buildings in the Washington metropolitan area. The company built or was the prime contractor for a number of landmark structures, including the Pentagon, the Jefferson Memorial, the John F. Kennedy Center for the Performing Arts, the Library of Congress annex, Washington National Airport, the Basilica of the National Shrine of the Immaculate Conception, and the 1949–1952 reconstruction of the White House. McShain also built the Franklin D. Roosevelt Library in Hyde Park, New York.

His career as a building contractor garnered McShain significant wealth. He started the John McShain Charities as his philanthropy arm. McShain acquired the Barclay Hotel on Philadelphia's Rittenhouse Square and became part owner of the Skyscraper By The Sea, the 400-room Claridge Hotel in Atlantic City, New Jersey.

=== Thoroughbred racing ===
In 1952, John McShain established Barclay Stable in the United States and in 1955 expanded its operations to Ireland. Based in New Jersey, his racing stable met with reasonable success at New York State tracks and Monmouth Park in New Jersey, notably with Turbo Jet II. However, his greatest racing success came in Europe, where in 1958 he was the British flat racing Champion Owner. McShain's colt Ballymoss won numerous prestigious races including Ireland's Irish Derby Stakes, England's St. Leger Stakes and France's Prix de l'Arc de Triomphe. Ballymoss was voted 1958 European Horse of the Year honors and in 1981 the Republic of Ireland honored him with his image on a postage stamp. McShain also owned the filly Gladness, who had victories in the Goodwood Cup and the Ascot Gold Cup.

=== Philanthropy ===
A devout Roman Catholic, McShain was a major benefactor to Wheeling Jesuit University. In 2000, the newly constructed admissions center was dedicated to the memory of him and his wife. McShain served on the Board of Directors of a number of major American corporations and educational institutions including St. Joseph's University, Catholic University, and Georgetown University. John also attended St. Joseph's Preparatory School, an urban Jesuit high school in North Philadelphia.

McShain was also a benefactor to La Salle University, his alma mater. He helped plan the construction of La Salle's original academic building, College Hall. McShain Hall at LaSalle was named after him. La Salle University also has a student award named after McShain, given out annually. The John McShain Award is offered to a member of the senior class who maintained an excellent scholastic record and is considered by faculty and staff to have done the most for the public welfare of La Salle.

Through the John McShain Charities, Sister Pauline McShain continued her parents' tradition of financial support for various Catholic organizations such as the Neumann University scholarship program.

== Personal life ==
In 1927, McShain married Mary J. Horstmann (1907–1998). Over the years, the McShains began visiting Ireland and in 1956 acquired Kenmare House together with 25,000 acres (100 km^{2}) in Killarney in County Kerry. He and his wife extensively renovated the building and renamed it Killarney House. In 1973, they gave Innisfallen Island and the ruins of its historic abbey to the government of Ireland. They are buried together in Philadelphia and commemorated with medallions at the Cathedral-Basilica of Sts. Peter and Paul. Their only child, Pauline McShain, became a Roman Catholic religious sister of the Society of the Holy Child Jesus. Having been empty for several years, the building fell into some disrepair. In July 2011, Leo Varadkar, the Irish Minister for Transport, Tourism and Sport, announced a €7 million restoration of the manor.

In 2018, his nieces Mary Anne O'Donnell, Judy White and nephew Robert McShain, along with his wife Janet, eight of their nine children and assorted other cousins and distant relatives attended the grand opening of the new Killarney House National Park dedication ceremony.

Pauline McShain died on March 8, 2019, from complications of pneumonia.
