= Upper Lake, Killarney =

Lake in County Kerry, Ireland

Upper Lake
- An Loch Uachtarach (Irish)
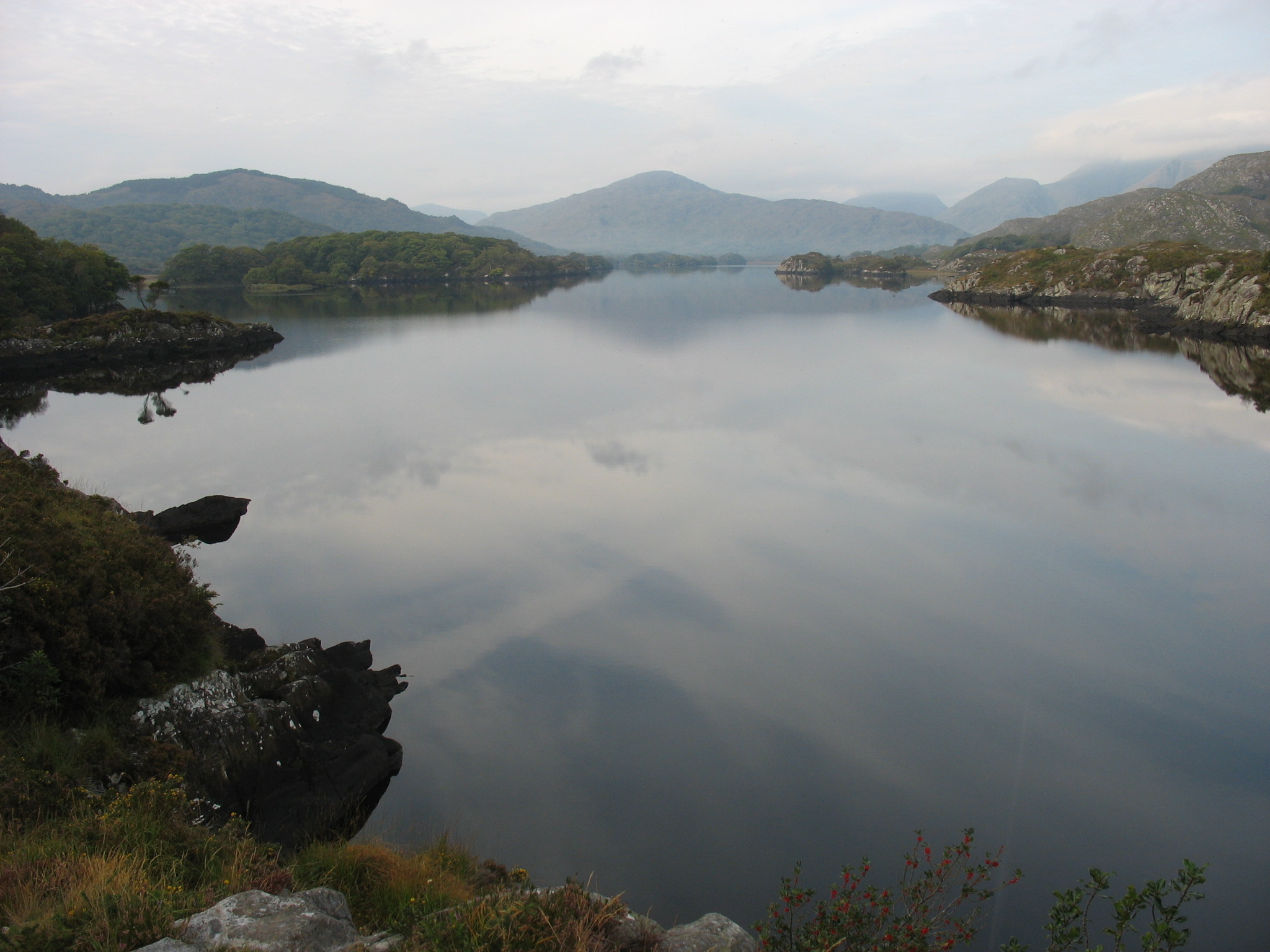

- Location within Ireland
- Location: Killarney National Park, County Kerry, Ireland
- Coordinates: 51.98038°N 9.592089°W
- Primary inflows: Gearhameen River
- Primary outflows: Muckross Lake
- Basin countries: Ireland
- Surface area: 1.7 km^{2} (0.66 sq mi)
- Surface elevation: 23 m (75 ft)
- Islands: McCarthy's Island, Eagle Island, Ronayne's Island, Juniper Island, Robinson's Island, Arbutus Island

Upper Lake (Irish: An Loch Uachtarach) is a lake in Killarney National Park, County Kerry, Ireland. It is one of the Lakes of Killarney, along with Muckross Lake and Lough Leane.

== See also ==
- List of loughs in Ireland
