= Salvelinus obtusus =

Conservation status
- Critically Endangered (IUCN 3.1)

Scientific classification
- Kingdom: Animalia
- Phylum: Chordata
- Class: Actinopterygii
- Division: Teleostei
- Order: Salmoniformes
- Family: Salmonidae
- Genus: Salvelinus
- Species: S. obtusus

Binomial name
- Salvelinus obtusus Regan, 1908

Synonyms
- Salvelinus evasus (Freyhof & Kottelat, 2005)

Species of salmonid fish native to ireland

Salvelinus obtusus, commonly called the blunt-nosed Irish charr or blunt-snouted Irish char, is a species of lacustrine char fish in the family Salmonidae, found in the Lakes of Killarney, Ireland.

Current location
Former location

== Taxonomy ==
=== Name ===
The English word "char[r]" is thought to derive from Old Irish ceara/cera meaning "[blood] red," referring to its pink-red underside. This would also connect with its Welsh name torgoch, "red belly."

The species name obtusus is Latin for "blunt."

== Biology ==
Salvelinus obtusus is benthopelagic and can grow up to 18 cm (7.1 in). It is distinguished from other Salvelinus in Ireland by its obtuse snout, rounded dorsal profile and short lower jaw, which is included in the upper jaw when the mouth is closed. Its body depth is 20–25% of snout length.

== Range ==
Salvelinus obtusus is only found in Muckross Lake and Lough Leane, and is threatened by eutrophication.

It was formerly found in Lough Tay, Lough Dan, Lough Nalughraman and Lough Acoose, but is now considered extirpated at those sites and is critically endangered.
