= Muckross Lake =

Lake in County Kerry, Ireland

- Loch Mhucrois (Irish)
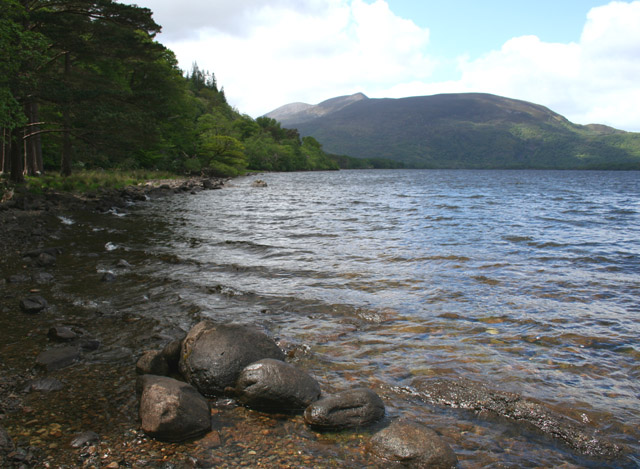
- Southern shore

- Location within Ireland
- Location: Killarney National Park, County Kerry, Ireland
- Coordinates: 52.011065°N 9.527247°W
- Primary inflows: Owengariff River
- Primary outflows: Lough Leane
- Basin countries: Ireland
- Surface area: 2.7 km^{2} (1.0 sq mi)
- Max. depth: 75 metres (246 ft)
- Surface elevation: 21 m (69 ft)
- Islands: Dinish Island, Brickeen Island, Devil's Island

Muckross Lake (Irish: Loch Mhucrois), also called Middle Lake or The Torc, is a lake in Killarney National Park, County Kerry, Ireland. It is one of the three famous Lakes of Killarney, along with Lough Leane and Upper Lake. It is Ireland's deepest lake, reaching to 75 metres (246 ft) in parts.

== Wildlife ==
The lake is a noted salmon and brown trout fishery.

It is also a habitat for the critically endangered blunt-snouted Irish char (Salvelinus obtusus).

== The monster ==
As with many lakes, Muckross Lake allegedly contains a monster.

== See also ==
- List of loughs in Ireland
