= Killarney National Park =

National park in County Kerry, Ireland

- Páirc Náisiúnta Chill Airne
- IUCN category II (national park)
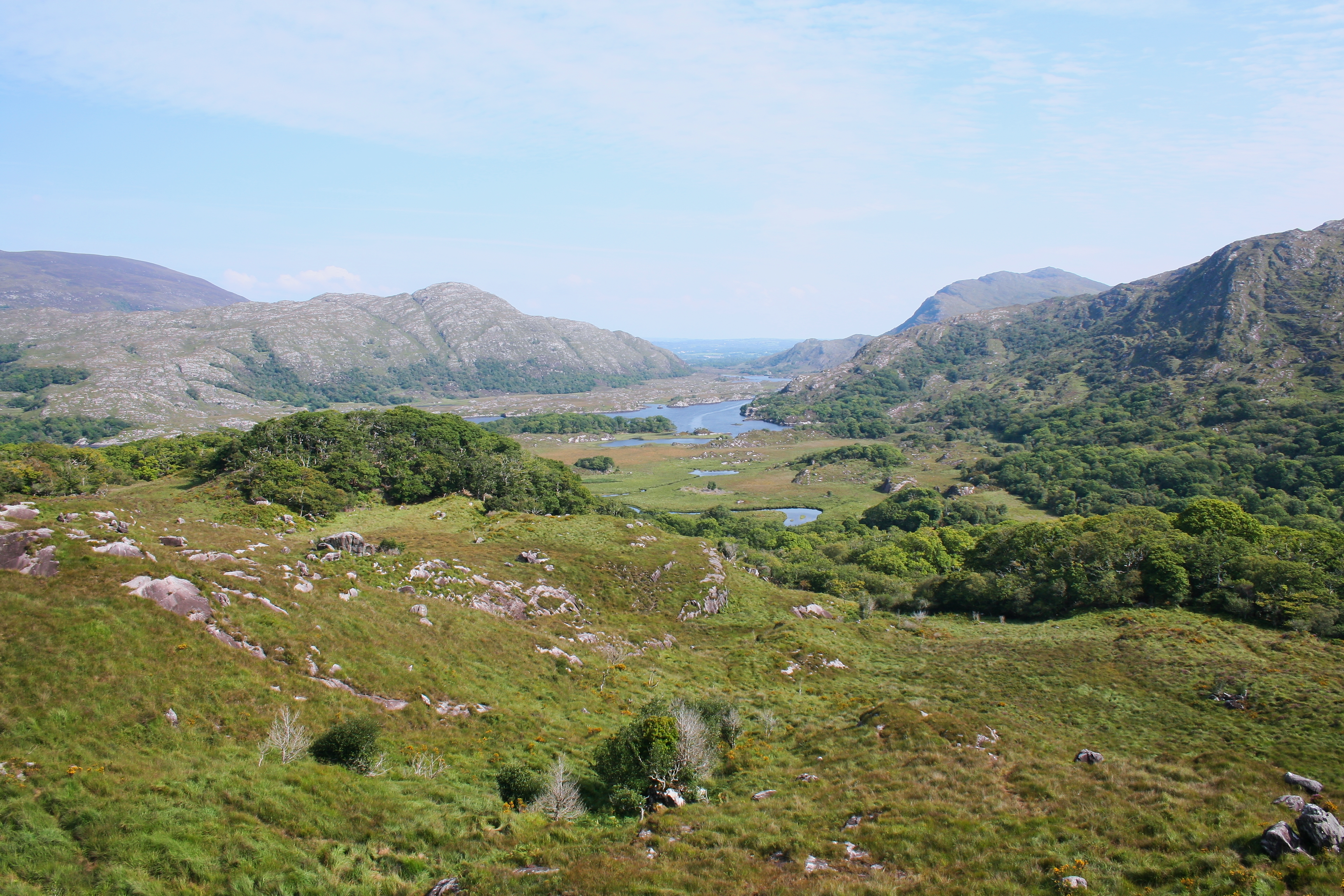

- Location within Ireland
- Location: Killarney, Ireland
- Nearest city: Cork
- Coordinates: 52°01′16″N 9°30′24″W
- Area: 102.89 km^{2} (39.73 sq mi)
- Established: 1932; 94 years ago
- Governing body: National Parks and Wildlife Service (Ireland)
- Website: www.nationalparks.ie/killarney/

National Parks in Ireland

Killarney National Park (Irish: Páirc Náisiúnta Chill Airne), near the town of Killarney, County Kerry, was the first national park in Ireland, created when the Muckross Estate was donated to the Irish Free State in 1932. The park has since been substantially expanded and encompasses over 102.89 km^{2} (25,425 acres) of diverse ecology, including the Lakes of Killarney, oak and yew woodlands of international importance, and mountain peaks. It has the only red deer herd on mainland Ireland and the most extensive covering of native forest remaining in Ireland. The park is of high ecological value because of the quality, diversity, and extensiveness of many of its habitats and the wide variety of species that they accommodate, some of which are rare. The park was designated a UNESCO Biosphere Reserve in 1981. The park forms part of a Special Area of Conservation and a Special Protection Area.

The National Parks and Wildlife Service is responsible for the management and administration of the park. Nature conservation is the main objective of the park, and ecosystems in their natural state are highly valued. The park is known for its scenery, and recreation and tourism amenities are provided for.

== Climate and geography ==
Killarney National Park is in southwest Ireland close to the island's most westerly point. The Lakes of Killarney and the Mangerton, Torc, Shehy and Purple Mountains are in the park. Altitudes in the park range from 22 metres (72 ft) to 842 metres (2,762 ft). A major geological boundary between Devonian Old Red Sandstone and Carboniferous limestone lies in the park. The underlying geology of the majority of the park is sandstone, with the limestone pavements occurring on the low eastern shore of Lough Leane.

Lough Leane is the largest of the Killarney lakes and contains over 30 islands. Some visitors avail of boat trips to Innisfallen, one of the larger islands on Lough Leane.

The park has an oceanic climate, heavily influenced by the Gulf Stream. It experiences mild winters (6 °C (43 °F) February average) and cool summers (15 °C (59 °F) July average). Mean daily temperatures range from a low of 5.88 °C (42.58 °F) in January to a high of 15.28 °C (59.50 °F) in July. The park experiences high rainfall and changeable fronts, with light showery rainfall being frequent throughout the year. The mean rainfall is 1,263 millimetres (49.7 in) per year, 223 days per annum typically having more than 1 millimetre (0.039 in) precipitation. The mean number of frost days is 40.

The geological boundary, the park's wide range of altitudes, and the climatic influence of the Gulf Stream combine to give the park a varied ecology. These ecosystems include bogs, lakes, moorland, mountains, waterways, woodland, parks and gardens. Outcropping rock, cliffs and crags are features of the park. Above 200 metres (660 ft), the mountainous sandstone areas support large areas of blanket bog and heath.

== History ==
=== Early history ===
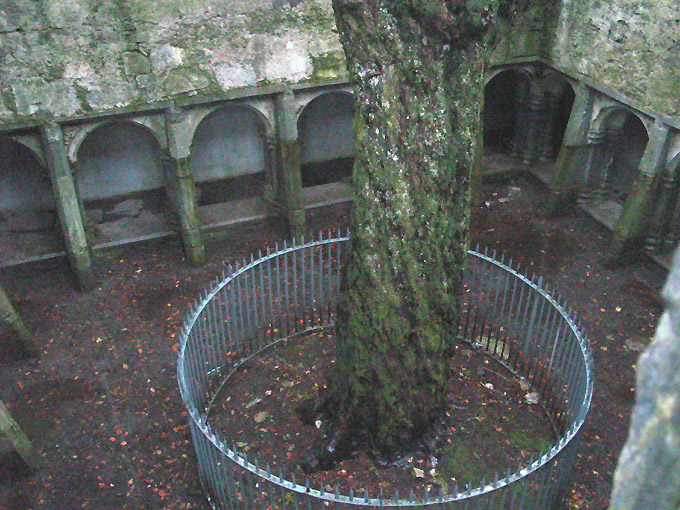
Cloistered courtyard in Muckross Abbey

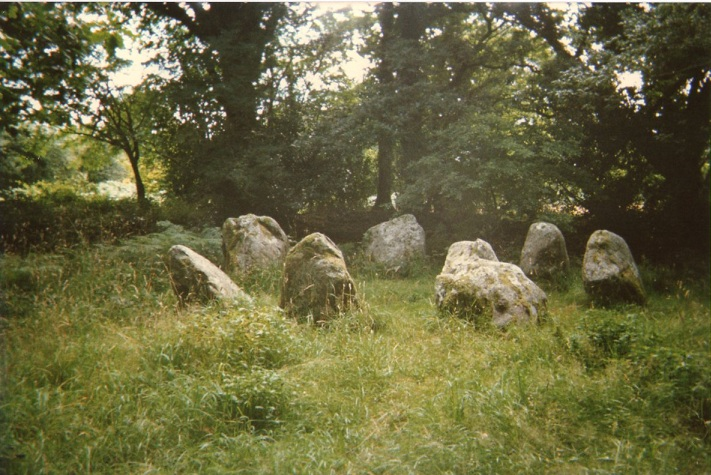
Lissivigeen Stone Circle, 3000 years old

Killarney National Park is one of the very few places in Ireland that has been continuously covered by woodland since the end of the most recent glacial period, approximately 10,000 years ago. Humans have lived in the area since at least the Bronze Age, approximately 4,000 years ago. Archaeologists have found evidence that copper mining took place in the Ross Island area during this period, which suggests that the area was of considerable importance to Bronze Age people. The park has many archaeological features, including a well preserved stone circle at Lissivigeen. The woods in the park have been disturbed and cleared at different periods since the Iron Age. This has caused a gradual decline in the diversity of tree species in the park.

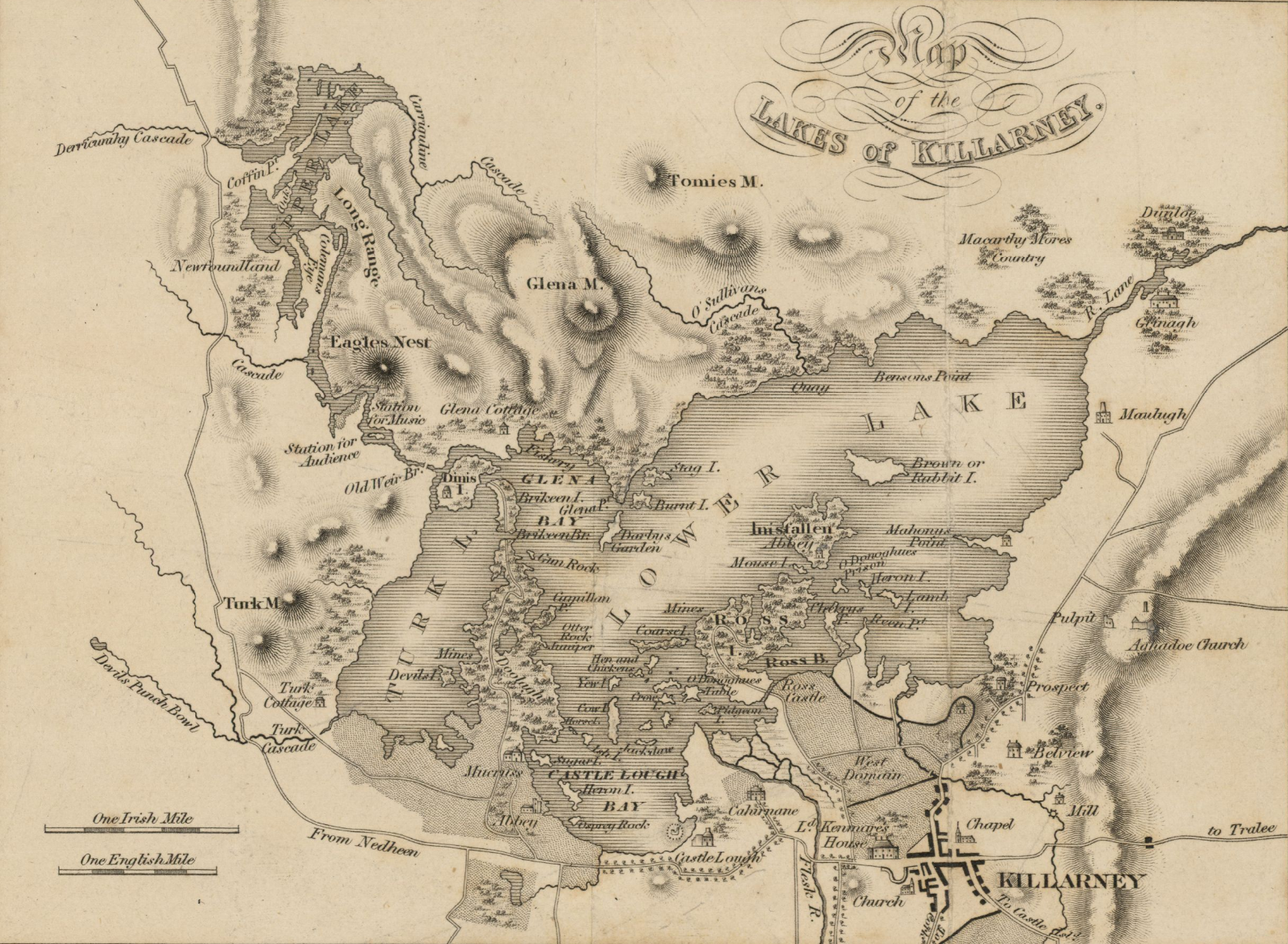
A 19th-century map of the Lakes of Killarney, produced for early tourists

Some of the most impressive archaeological remains in the park are from the early Christian period. The most important of these features is Inisfallen Abbey, the ruins of a monastic settlement on Inisfallen Island in Lough Leane. It was founded in the 7th century CE by St. Finian the Leper and was occupied until the 14th century. The Annals of Inisfallen, a record of the early history of Ireland as it was known by the monks, was written in the monastery from the 11th to 13th centuries. It is thought that the monastery gave rise to the name Lough Leane, which means "Lake of Learning".

Muckross Abbey was founded in 1448 by Observantine Franciscans and is also still standing, despite having been damaged and reconstructed several times when its inhabitants were raided. "Friars Glen" on Mangerton Mountain is customarily said to have been one of the places the monks would flee to when the monastery was attacked. The central feature of Muckross Abbey is a central courtyard that contains a huge yew tree surrounded by a vaulted cloister. It is traditionally said that this tree is as old as Muckross Abbey itself. The abbey was the burial place of local chieftains. In the 17th and 18th centuries the Kerry poets Seafraidh O'Donoghue, Aogán Ó Rathaille, and Eoghan Rua Ó Súilleabháin were buried there.

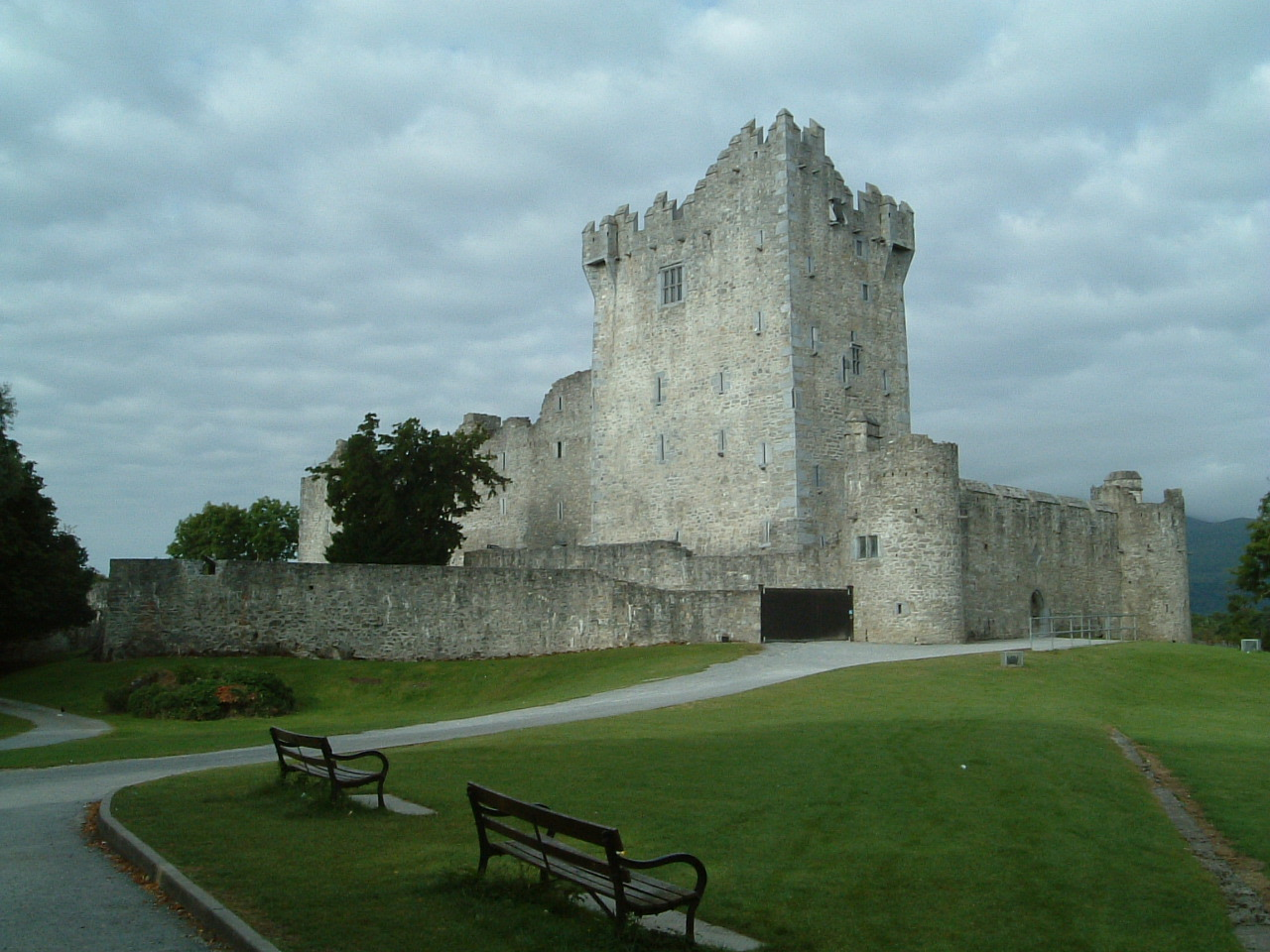
Ross Castle

After the Norman invasion of Ireland, the land around the lakes was owned by the McCarthys and O'Donoghues. Ross Castle is a 15th-century tower house on the shore of Lough Leane. It was once the residence of the chieftain O'Donoghue Mór. The castle was extended in the 17th century. It has been restored and is open to the public. A 1580s Elizabethan military record describes the Killarney area as a meagrely inhabited wilderness of forest and mountains.

From the 18th century the land in today's park were divided between two great estates, the Herberts of Muckross and the Brownes (Earls of Kenmare). During the 17th and 18th centuries the woods were extensively utilised for local industries including charcoal production, cooperage and tanning. Pressure on the woods intensified in the later part of the 18th century. The biggest cause of oakwood destruction in Killarney in the 18th century was the production of charcoal to fire smelters used in the local iron industry. Approximately 25 tons of oak was needed to produce one ton of cast iron. In 1780 Young famously described Derrycunihy wood as "a great sweep of mountain, covered partly in wood, hanging in a very noble manner, but part cut down, much of it mangled, and the rest inhabited by coopers, boat-builders, carpenters and turners.."..

Woodland exploitation again increased during the Napoleonic era in the early 19th century, probably because of the high prices that oak was commanding at this time. Replanting and management of the oak forests was promoted at this time. There was a large-scale felling of oak trees at Ross Island in 1803, Glena in around 1804 and Tomies in 1805. Tomies was then replanted with three-year-old oak and Glena was coppiced. These activities have increased the relative abundance of oak in the park in the past 200 years. As most of the oak trees in the woods today are around 200 years old, it is likely that the majority of them were planted, and the oakwoods that have never been disturbed by humans are restricted to a few isolated pockets in remote areas such as mountain valleys.

The Herbert family owned the land on the Muckross Peninsula from 1770 onwards. They became very wealthy from copper mines on this land. Henry Arthur Herbert and his wife—the water colourist Mary Balfour Herbert—finished building Muckross House in 1843. The Herbert's financial situation became precarious in the late 19th century, and the Muckross estate was purchased by Lord Ardilaun of the Guinness brewing family in 1899.

=== Creation of the park ===
In 1910, the American William Bowers Bourn bought Muckross Estate as a wedding present for his daughter Maud on her marriage to Arthur Vincent. They spent £110,000 improving the estate between 1911 and 1932, building the Sunken Garden, the Stream Garden, and a rock garden on an outcrop of limestone.

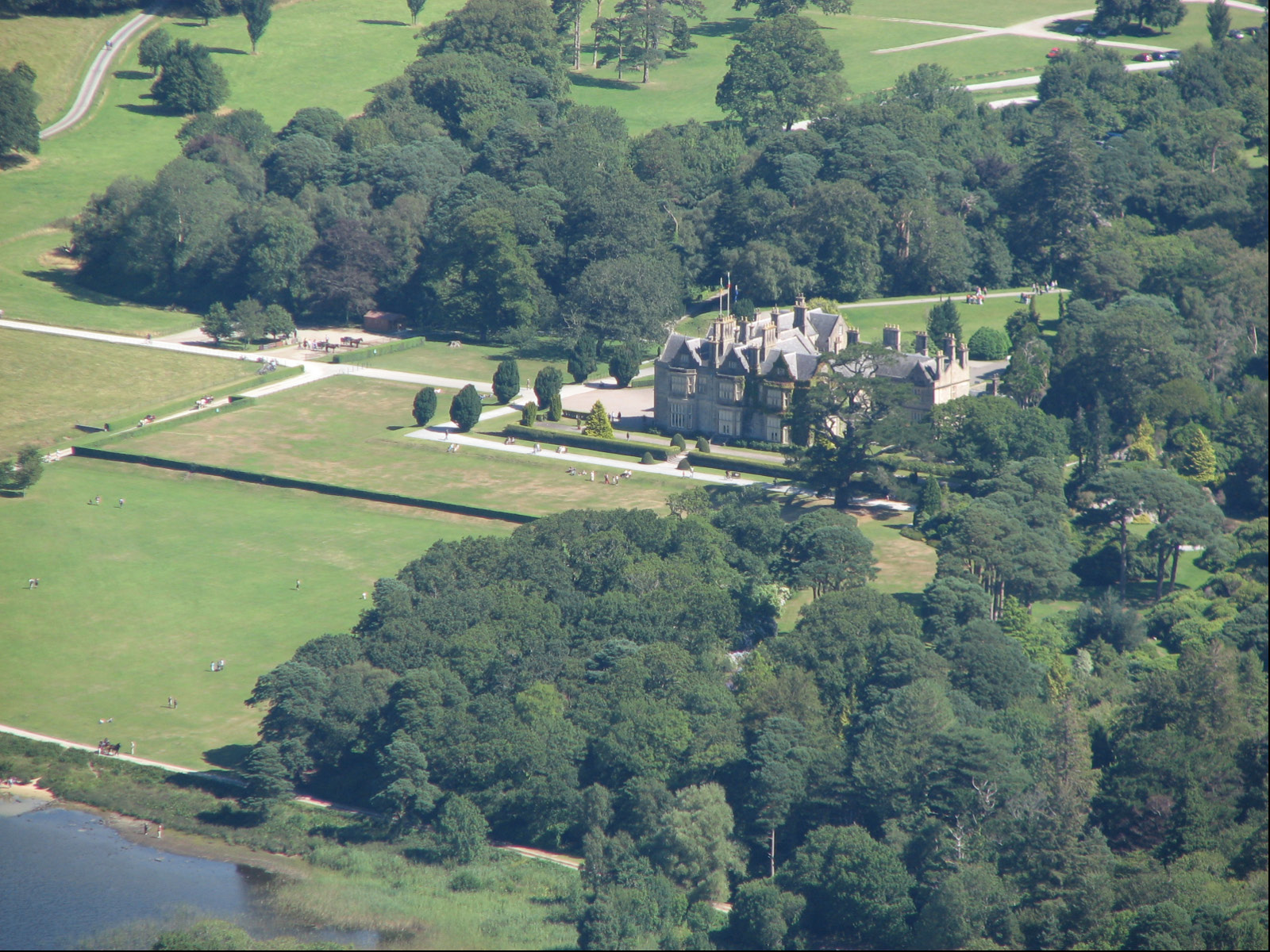
Muckross House as seen from the top of Torc Mountain

Maud Vincent died from pneumonia in 1929. In 1932, Arthur Vincent and his parents-in-law donated Muckross Estate to the Irish state in her memory. The 43.3 square kilometres (10,700 acres) estate was renamed as the Bourn Vincent Memorial Park. The Irish government created the national park by passing the Bourn Vincent Memorial Park Act in 1932. The Act required the Commissioners of Public Works to "maintain and manage the Park as a National Park for the purpose of the recreation and enjoyment of the public". The memorial park is the core of today's enlarged national park.

Initially the Irish Government was unable to provide much financial support to the park, so it operated primarily as a working farm that was open to the public. Muckross House was closed to the public until 1964.

Around 1970 there was public disquiet about threats to the Bourn Vincent Memorial Park. The Irish authorities looked at international practices in classifying and managing of national parks. It was decided to expand and re-designate the park as a national park that corresponded broadly to IUCN Category II. A decision was also made to establish other national parks in Ireland. Almost 60 square kilometres (15,000 acres) has been added to the original park, including the three lakes, Knockreer Estate, Ross Island, Innisfallen, and the townlands of Glena, Ullauns, and Poulagower. The park is now more than double the size it was in 1932. As the Irish economy became wealthier and the perception of the role of national parks changed, much more money was made available to the park.

== Lakes of Killarney ==
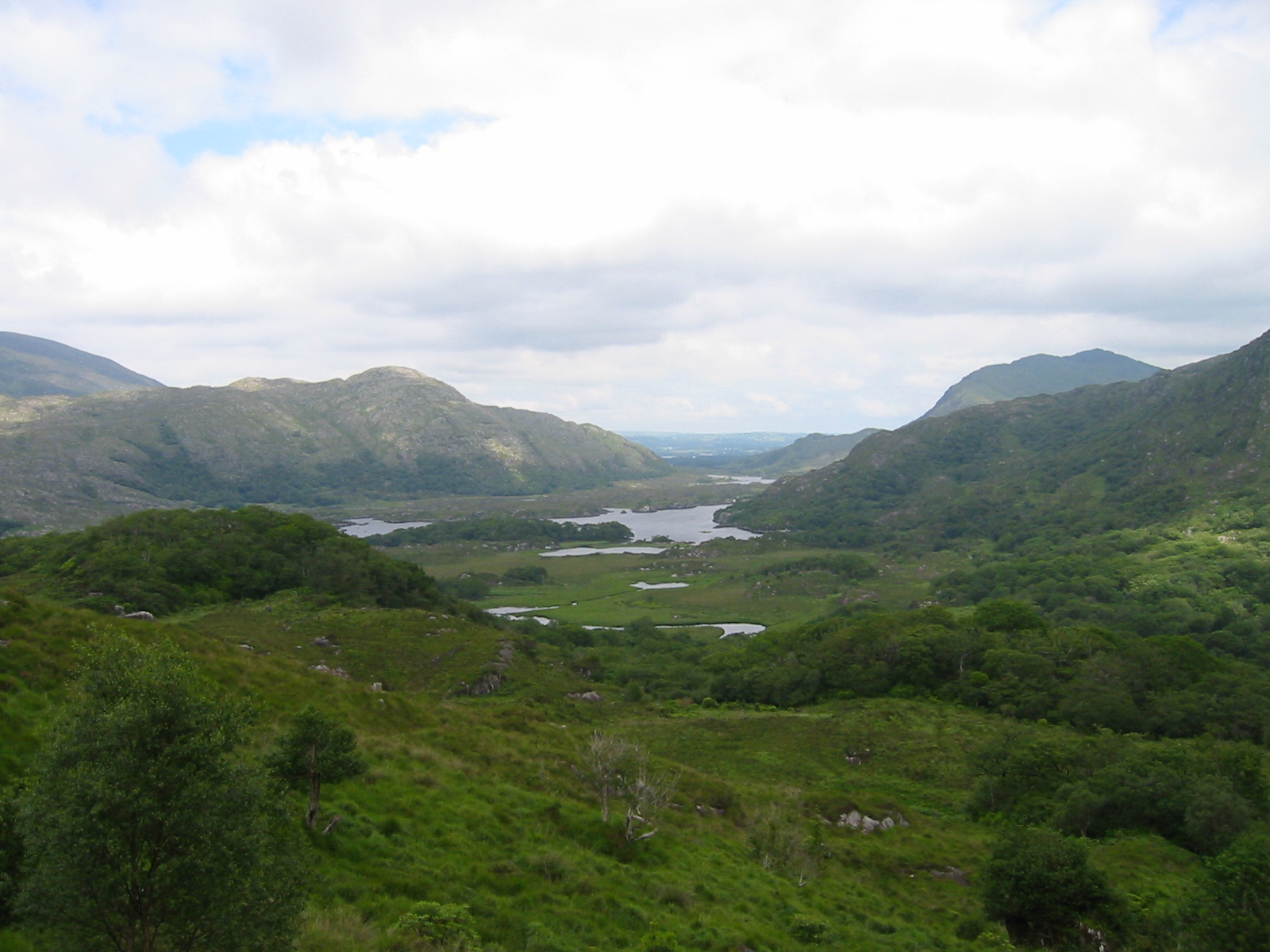
The Lakes of Killarney as viewed from Ladies View. Ladies' View provides a good view of the Lakes including the Gap of Dunloe, the Black Valley and Ross Castle.

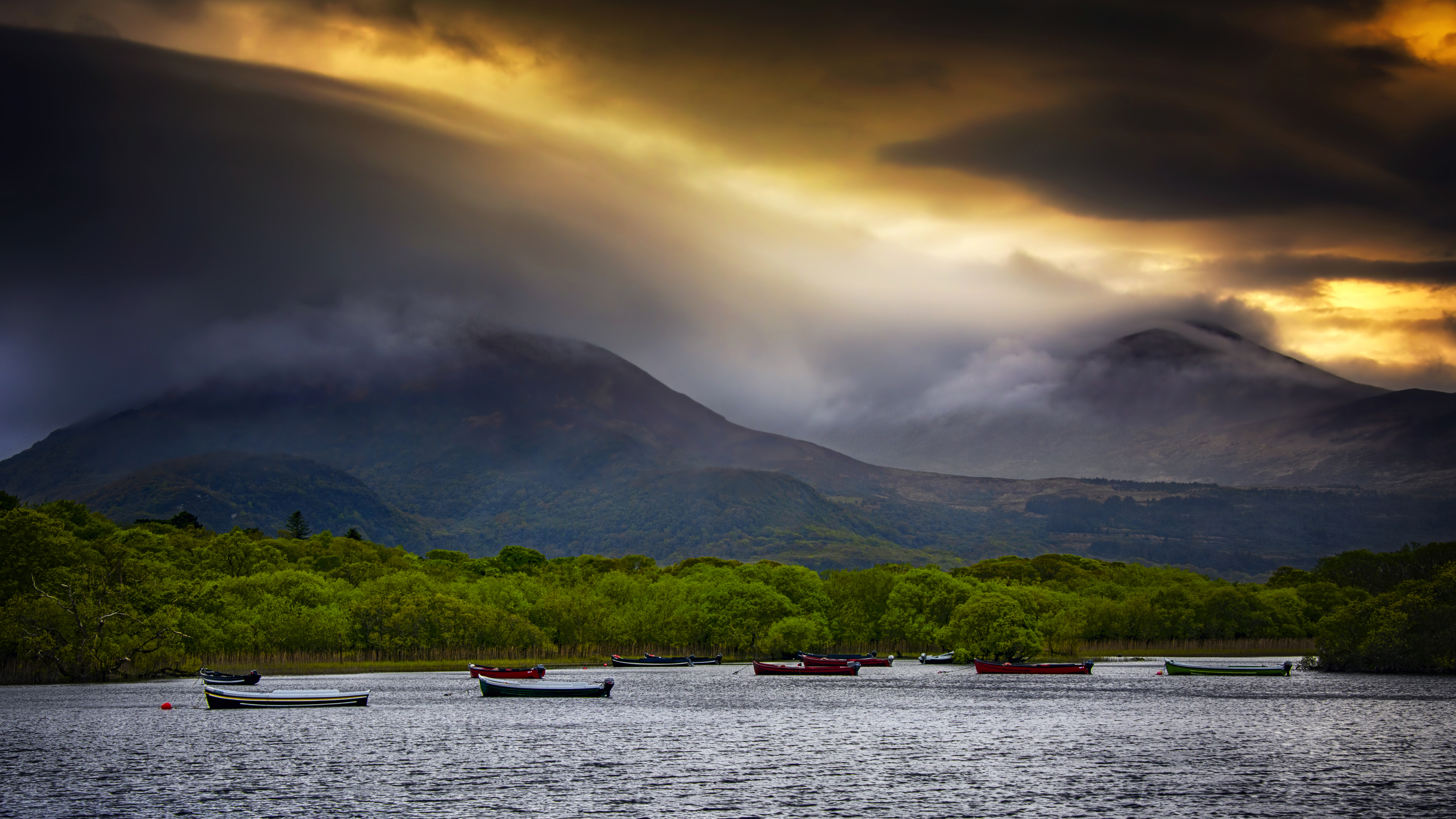
Killarney Lake – Ireland

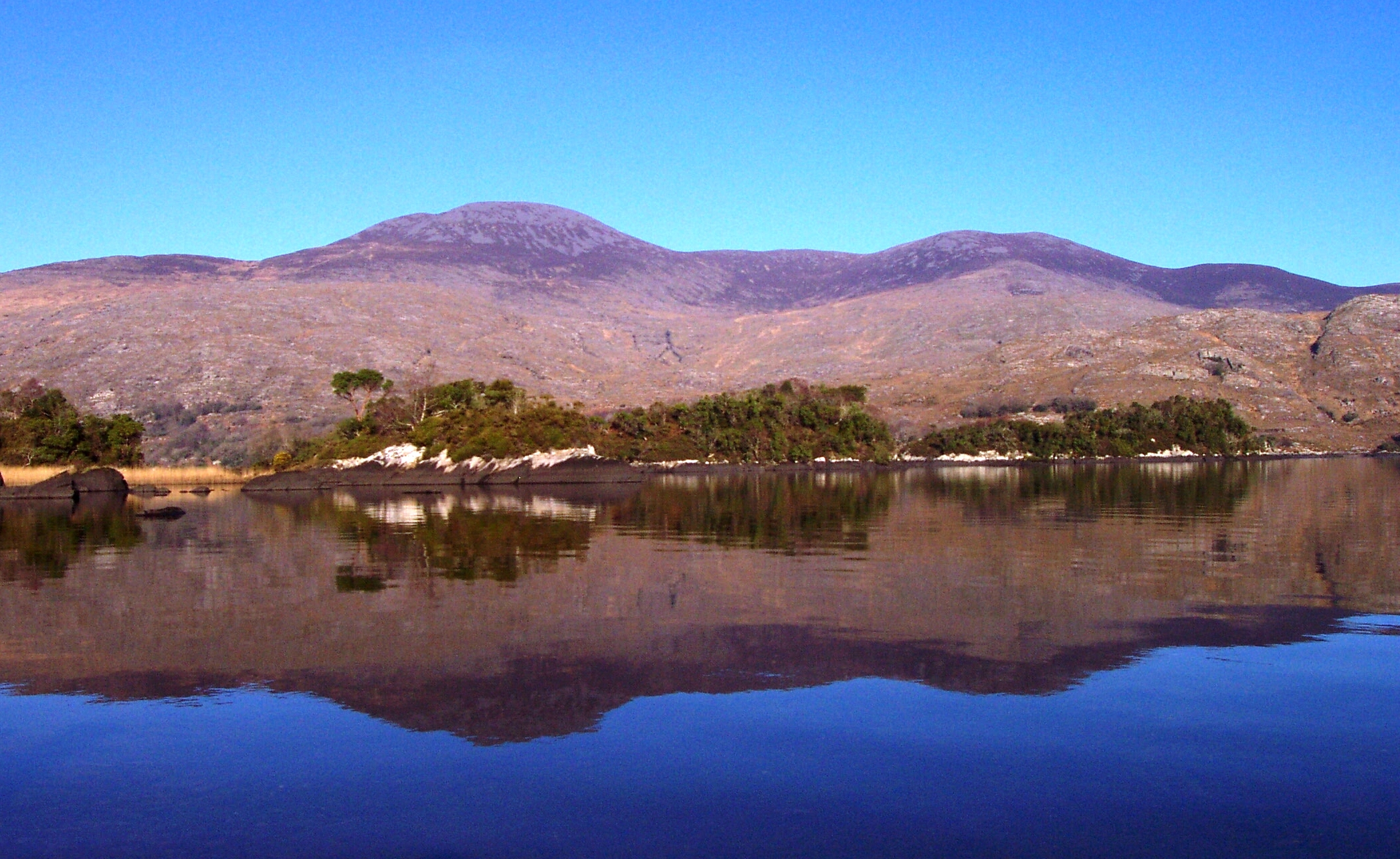
The Purple Mountains, viewed from the Upper Lake

The Lakes of Killarney are Lough Leane (the lower lake), Muckross Lake (the middle lake), and the Upper Lake. These lakes are interlinked and together make up almost a quarter of the park's area. Despite being interlinked, each lake has a unique ecosystem. The lakes join at the Meeting of the Waters, a popular tourist area. Sport angling on the lakes has been a pastime in the area for some time, in particular of the lakes' brown trout and salmon populations.

Lough Leane is approximately 19 square kilometres (4,700 acres) in size and is by far the largest of the three lakes. It is also the largest body of fresh water in the region. It is also the lake richest in nutrients. It has become eutrophic as a result of phosphates from agricultural and domestic pollution entering Lough Leane Reedbed, an important habitat on the edge of Lough Leane. This nutrient enrichment has caused several algal blooms in recent years. The blooms have not yet had a severe effect on the lake's ecosystem. To prevent further pollution causing a permanent change in the lake's ecosystem, a review of land use in the catchment area is being carried out. Water quality in the lake appears to have improved since phosphates were removed from sewage in 1985. As of August 2007, several large hotels and businesses have stated their intention to stop using phosphate detergents, in an effort to preserve the quality of the lake water.

Muckross Lake is the deepest of the three lakes. It has a maximum depth of 73.5 metres (241 ft), close to where the steeply sloping side of Torc Mountain enters the lake. The lake lies on the geological boundary between the sandstone mountains to the south and west and the limestone to the north.

Lough Leane and Muckross Lake lie across the geological boundary. The presence of limestone causes both of the lakes to be slightly richer in nutrients than the Upper Lake. There are many caves in the limestone at lake level, created by wave action combined with the dissolution effect of the lakes' acidic water on the exposed rock. These caves are largest on the northern shore of Muckross Lake.

From the Meeting of the Waters a narrow channel called the Long Range leads to the Upper Lake, the smallest of the three lakes. This lake is located in rugged mountain scenery in the upper Killarney/Black Valley area. The fast run-off in its catchment area can cause the level of the lake to rise by up to a meter in a few hours during heavy rain.

Muckross Lake and the Upper Lake are high quality oligotrophic systems, with water that is slightly acidic and low in nutrients. This is caused by run-off from the upland sandstones and blanket bogs in their catchment areas. They have diverse aquatic vegetation, including quillwort (Isoetes lacustris), shoreweed (Littorella uniflora), and water lobelia (Lobelia dortmanna).

All three lakes are very acid sensitive and therefore vulnerable to afforestation within their catchment areas.

== Woodlands ==
Killarney possesses the most extensive area (approximately 120 square kilometres (30,000 acres)) of semi-natural native woodland (woodland dominated by indigenous species) remaining in Ireland. Most of this woodland is encompassed by the national park. There are three main types of woodland in the park: acidophilous oak woodland (Quercus petraea-Ilex aquifolium) on Devonian sandstone; moss-rich yew woodland (Taxus baccata) on Carboniferous limestone outcrops; and wet woodland (also called carr) dominated by alder on low-lying swampy limestone soils on the lake edges. The woods in the park fall naturally into two sectors, along the geologic divide. The oak and yew woodlands are of international importance.

Mixed woodland and conifer plantations also occur in the park. The mixed woodland on Ross Island has one of the richest herb layers in the park's woods.

Grazing and rhododendron invasion threaten the park's woodlands. Rhododendrons affect approximately two-thirds of the oak woodlands. A rhododendron removal programme is under way in the park. The yew woodlands have been negatively affected by heavy grazing for many years.

=== Oak woodlands ===
The park is perhaps most famous for its oak woodlands, which are about 12.2 square kilometres (3,000 acres) in size. They form the largest area of native woodland remaining in Ireland and are a remnant of the woodland that once covered much of Ireland. Derrycunihy Wood is perhaps the most natural sessile oak (Quercus petraea) wood in Ireland. Most of the oak woodlands are located on the lower slopes of the Shehy and Tomy mountains, adjacent to Lough Leane. They are typically dominated by sessile oak, which favours the acidic soils of the sandstone mountains. The woods have Annex I status in the EU Habitats Directive because of their diverse and rich flora, most notably their bryophytes (mosses and liverworts).

The oak woodlands typically have an understory of holly (Ilex aquifolium). Strawberry trees (Arbutus unedo) are a notable part of these woods. There are also scattered yews. The field layer includes bilberry and woodrush. The herb layer is not rich in species.

Bryophytes, lichens and filmy ferns (Hymenophyllaceae), thrive in the humid oceanic climate. Species with restricted Atlantic distributions grow in the woods. The bryophytes in these woods are perhaps the best-developed Atlantic bryophyte community in Europe. The remote Glaism na Marbh valley has a particularly rich flora of bryophytes, some of which are scarce or absent in other parts of the woods. Mosses, ferns and liverworts frequently occur as epiphytes, attached to the trunks and branches of oak trees. Rare species growing in the woods include Cyclodictyon laetevirens, Daltonia splachnoides, Lejeunea flava, Radula carringtonii, and Sematophyllum demissum.

Bird species that reside in the oak woods include blue tit, common chaffinch, goldcrest, European robin, and wren. Mammals include badger, red fox, pine marten, red deer, sika deer, and red squirrel. Insects include many species of the parasitic gall wasp and the purple hairstreak butterfly, whose caterpillar is entirely dependent upon oak trees.

The introduced common rhododendron is a large threat to certain areas of the oak woods. For example, it is widespread throughout Camillan Wood despite ongoing attempts to control it.

=== Yew woodlands ===
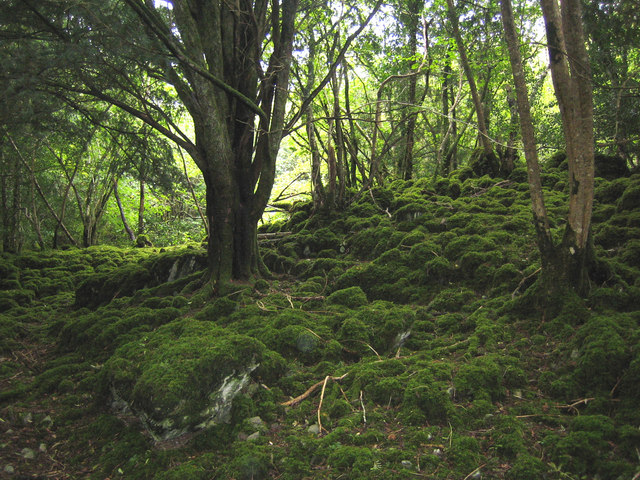
Reenadinna yew wood

The yew woodland in the park is known as Reenadinna Wood. It is about 0.25 square kilometres (62 acres) in size and is located on low-lying karst limestone pavement between Muckross Lake and Lough Leane on Muckross Peninsula. Yew woodland is the rarest habitat type in the park. Yew woodlands are one of the rarest types of woodland in Europe, mostly restricted to western Ireland and southern England. It has priority habitat status under Annex I of the EU Habitats Directive. Reenadinna Wood is also one of the largest woods that are dominated by common yew (Taxus baccata L.) in the UK and Ireland. It is the only significant area of yew woodland in Ireland and is one of just three pure yew woodlands in Europe. It is of considerable ecological and conservation interest, as yew is rarely a woodland dominant. The western limit of the wood lies along the geological boundary with Devonian Old Red Sandstone. The wood is bounded to the east by parkland where the limestone no longer outcrops. Muckross bog, a raised bog 0.02 square kilometres (4.9 acres) in area, is in the southern part of the wood. There are hollows between the limestone outcrops. Deep rendzina soils have developed in some of the hollows. It is estimated that the wood developed 3,000–5,000 years ago.

Yew is a native evergreen tree that grows best in the high humidity of mild oceanic climates, which makes Killarney a very suitable location. The soil in the wood is mostly thin and in many places the trees are rooted to fissures in the bare limestone. Yew has an extensive horizontal root system. In the Killarney woods, the roots spread out over the rock surface and penetrate deeply into fissures in the limestone. The wood has a low canopy of 6–14 m (20–46 ft). Yew's extreme tolerance of the dense shade its canopy creates has allowed it to outcompete other species to create the pure yew woodland present today. This dense shade prevents flowering plants from establishing themselves in these woods and prevents the herb layer from developing. Bryophytes are, however, abundant and thrive in humid and cool conditions. In some parts of the wood, there are continuous dense blankets of moss that can be up to 152 centimetres (60 in) deep. The moss species present are primarily Thamnium alopecurum with Eurhynchium striatum and Thuidium tamariscinum.

Some of the trees in Re-enadinna wood are two hundred years old. There has been little regeneration of the yew trees in the wood. Overgrazing of the woodland floor by sika deer may be part of the reason for this, but small areas of the wood that have been fenced off since 1969 have experienced very little yew regeneration. The dense canopy created by the yew trees that lets very little sunlight through to the woodland floor may also prevent the growth of yew seedlings.

Despite its poisonous properties, yew is very susceptible to browsing and bark stripping by deer, rabbits, hare, and domestic animals. It is one of the most grazing sensitive trees in the Killarney woodlands. Sika deer have killed yews by scoring the trees with their antlers.

=== Wet woodlands ===
Wet woodland (also called carr) on the low-lying swampy limestone areas within Lough Leane's floodplain is about 1.7 square kilometres (420 acres) in size. This is one of the most extensive areas of this woodland type in Ireland. The dominant canopy species here are alder (Alnus glutinosa), ash (Fraxinus excelsior), downy birch (Betula pubescens), and willow (Salix spp.). The areas that are periodically covered by water are rich in species including grasses, rushes, sedges, and flowers such as marsh bedstraw, meadow sweet, and water mint.

Red deer and sika deer heavily use the wetland woods as cover, and bare muddy "deer wallows" are a characteristic feature. Rhododendrons are the greatest threat to these woodlands. They are invading the woodlands, using raised areas such as tussocks or tree bases where the floor is too wet for seedlings to become established. Although some clearance has occurred reinvasion continues.

== Bogland ==
While the lower slopes of the mountains are dominated by sessile oak (Quercus petraea), above 200 metres (660 ft) the mountains are virtually treeless and are dominated by blanket bog and wet heath. The bogs in the park mostly have a characteristic flora that includes heather (Calluna vulgaris), bell heather (Erica cinerea) and western gorse (Ulex gallii), with occasional bilberry (Vaccinium myrtillus). Large-flowered butterwort (Pinguicula grandiflora) is common. The bogs also support a number of notable species, including mosses (Sphagnum pulchrum, S. fuscum, S. platyphyllum, S. strictum, S. contortum and Calliergon stramineum), liverworts (Cladopodiella francisci and Calypogeia azurea) and lichens (Cladonia mediterranea, C. macilenta, C. rangiferina, C. arbuscula and Cetraria islandica).

The remoteness of some of the upland areas aids the survival of Ireland's only remaining wild herd of native red deer. The bogs are threatened by grazing, turbary, burning and afforestation.

== Flora ==
A large number of plant and animal species of interest occur within the site, including most of the native Irish mammal species, several important fish species including Arctic char, and a range of rare or scarce plant species. Several of the animal and plant species in the park have a hiberno-lusitanean distribution, meaning that they only occur in southwest Ireland, northern Spain, and Portugal. The main reason for this is the effect of the Gulf Stream on southwest Ireland's climate. The park has been designated a biosphere reserve because of the presence of such rare species.

Significant amounts of plant species found in the park have unusual geographic distributions and are of localised occurrence within Ireland. These plant species are grouped within four main categories: arctic-alpine plants, Atlantic species, North American species and very rare species. Atlantic species are species which are otherwise found mostly in southern and south-western Europe, for example arbutus, St Patrick's cabbage and greater butterwort. North American species include blue-eyed grass and pipewort.

=== Bryophytes ===
Bryophytes (mosses and liverworts) flourish in the park, due partly to the area's mild oceanic climate. The park is internationally significant for bryophytes. Many of the bryophytes found in the park are not found anywhere else in Ireland. Mosses, ferns such as filmy ferns, and liverworts grow luxuriantly. Many of them live as epiphytes, growing on the branches and trunks of trees.

=== Other plant species ===
The Killarney fern (Trichomanes speciosum) is probably the most rare plant species in the park. It is a filmy fern that grows in the splash zone of waterfalls and other damp places. Although it was once quite common, it was picked almost to extinction when pickers collected it to be sold to tourists. The few sites where this fern remain tend to be in isolated mountainous locations where pickers never found it.

Although the strawberry tree (Arbutus unedo) is relatively common in the park, it is one of Ireland's rarest native tree species and is found in very few locations outside Killarney. In the park it is found on cliff tops and the edges of the woodlands around the lake.

Killarney whitebeam (Sorbus anglica) is a shrub or small tree that grows on rocks close to lakeshores. It is found only in Killarney. The more common Irish whitebeam (Sorbus hibernica) is also found in the park.

The greater butterwort (Pinguicula grandiflora) (also known as the Kerry violet) is a carnivorous plant found in bogs. It digests insects to supplement the poor supply of nutrients (especially nitrogen) available from the bog. Its purple flowers bloom in late May and early June.

Irish spurge (Euphorbia hyberna) is an Atlantic species that in Ireland is only found in the southwest. In the past the milky sap from its stem was used to cure warts. Fishermen used it to capture fish, utilising compounds in the sap that prevent fish gills from functioning properly and so suffocate the fish.

A number of rare species of myxomycete fungus have been recorded in the park. These are Collaria arcyrionema, Craterium muscorum, Cribraria microcarpa (the only known location in Ireland), C. rufa, C. violacea, Diderma chondrioderma, D. lucidum, D. ochraceum, Fuligo muscorum, and Licea marginata. The park has a highly diverse lichen flora.

== Fauna ==
=== Mammals ===
Most mammals native to Ireland and long established introduced species are found in the park. The bank vole was first identified in 1964 in northwest Kerry. Its range has now expanded and now includes the park. Pine marten is another notable species in the park.

==== Deer ====
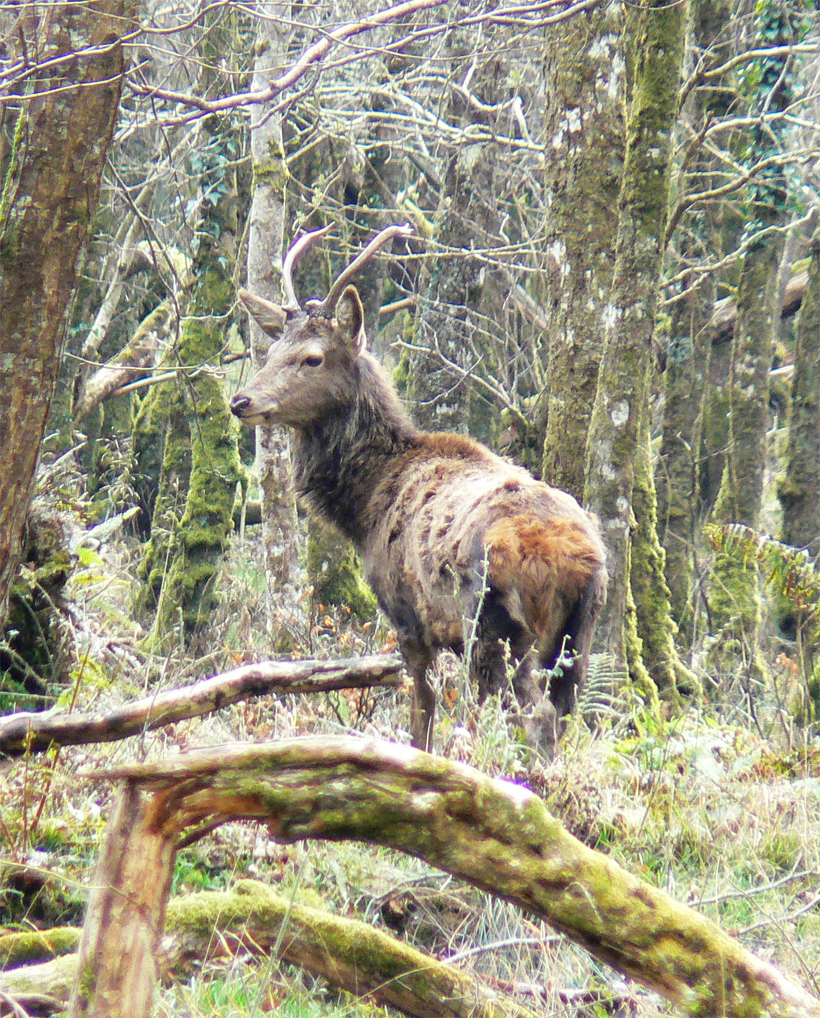
A male red deer in oak woodland

The park has Ireland's only remaining wild herd of native deer (Cervus elaphus hibernicus), comprising approximately 900 individuals. an increase from less than 100 individuals in 1970. They are found in upland areas of the park, mostly on Mangerton and Torc mountains. This herd has been continuously in Ireland for 4,000 years, since the return of red deer to the island, possibly aided by humans, after the last ice age, approximately 10,500 years ago. They were protected in the past by the Kenmare and Muckross estates. The herd is not completely pure because stags were introduced to the herd to improve antler quality in the 19th century.

Pregnant hinds from the lowland areas frequently go to the mountains to give birth in early June. The National Park staff tags the calves. Although red deer and sika deer are capable of interbreeding, no cases of crossbreeding have been recorded in the park. High priority is given to maintaining the genetic purity of the native red deer herd. Red deer are fully protected by law, and their hunting is not permitted.

Sika deer (Cervus nippon) were introduced to the park from Japan in 1865. Their population has increased considerably since then. It is estimated there is also up to 1000 Sika deer in Killarney National Park. Within the park they are found both on open upland areas and woodlands.

=== Bird species ===
The Park boasts a wealth of bird life, and is of ornithological importance because it supports a diverse range of birds. 141 bird species have been recorded in the park, including upland, woodland and wintering waterfowl species. Several species which are otherwise rare in Ireland are present, notably the woodland species redstart (1–2 pairs), wood warbler (1–2 pairs), and garden warbler (possibly up to 10 pairs). The red grouse and ring ouzel are on the IUCN Red List of species of high conservation concern (1–2 pairs each). The Greenland white-fronted goose, merlin, and peregrine are listed on Annex I of the EU Birds Directive. Other noteworthy species found in the park are the chough, nightjar, and osprey. The osprey sometimes passes through the park as it migrates between northern Africa and Scandinavia. Historical accounts and place names suggest that the osprey bred in the area in the past. Golden eagles once nested in the park, but were extirpated around 1900 as a result of disturbance, nest robbing, and persecution.

The most common bird species in upland areas are meadow pipits, ravens and European stonechats. Rare species are merlins (up to five pairs) and peregrine falcons (at least one pair).

Chaffinches and robins are the most common species in the woodlands. Other species that breed there include blackcaps and garden warblers. The rare redstart and wood warbler are thought to have a few breeding pairs in the park's woodlands.

Grey herons, little grebes, mallards, water rails, dippers and common kingfishers live on the park's water bodies.

Lough Leane, and the other lakes to a lesser extent, support wintering birds that travel south from higher latitudes. These species include redwing, fieldfare, golden plover and waterfowl such as teal, goldeneye, wigeon, pochard and whooper swan. The park's native bird populations are augmented by migrant species in both winter and summer. A small flock of Greenland white-fronted geese (Anser albifrons flavirostris) from the world population of approximately 12,000 migrates to winter on boglands in the Killarney Valley within the park. The numbers of this bird that stay in the park are currently low, at less than twenty individuals. This population is important because it is the most southerly in Ireland and one of the few remaining populations remaining that feed entirely on bogland, and whose habitat almost entirely lies within a protected area.

Other wintering waterfowls are coot, cormorant, goldeneye, mallard, pochard, teal, and tufted duck. Other species that live on the lakes are the black-headed gull, little grebe, and mute swan.

Species that migrate from Africa in the summer include cuckoos, swallows, and swifts. Some species are vagrants that appear sporadically, for example when there is stormy weather or an unusually cold spell on the European continent.

The park is also the site for a project to reintroduce white-tailed eagles, which began in 2007 with the release of fifteen birds. The project will last a number of years with many more eagles being released. The species had become extinct in Ireland in the 19th century after persecution from landowners. Fifteen chicks will then be brought in annually for the following five years. Despite a poisoning incident in 2009, the program is continuing and birds introduced to the area have now been tracked to Wicklow and Donegal.

=== Fish species ===
The Lakes of Killarney contain many brown trout and an annual run of salmon. Rare species found in the lakes are Arctic char and Killarney shad. The lakes have natural stocks of brown trout and salmon that can be fished, subject only to usual Irish salmon license regulations.

The lakes contain Arctic char (Salvelinus alpinus L.), which is usually found much further north in sub-Arctic lakes. It's a relict species left behind in the area after the last Ice Age, and are consequently indicative of pristine environmental conditions. Although they were once widespread, they now are confined to isolated populations in inland freshwater lakes that have a suitable habitat. They are isolated in their respective lakes since the last Ice age. They are extremely sensitive to environmental changes when they are as far south as Ireland, where they are at the southern edge of their species range. The greatest threats to their survival in Ireland are introduced fish species, eutrophication, acidification and climate change. The rate of extinction of entire populations in Ireland has increased in recent decades.

The Killarney shad (or goureen) (Alosa fallax killarnensis) is a land-locked lake-dwelling subspecies of twaite shad, a mostly marine species. It is unique to the Lakes of Killarney. It is rarely seen because it feeds mainly on plankton and thus is rarely caught by fishers. It is listed in the Irish "Red Data Book" of threatened species. It is listed in Annex II of the EU Habitats Directive.

=== Invertebrates ===
Several unusual invertebrate species can be found in the Killarney valley. Some of these species, including the northern emerald dragonfly (Somatochlora arctica) and several caddisfly and stonefly species are usually found much further north in Europe. They are thought to be relict species that were left behind in Killarney after the last retreat of ice. The northern or moorland emerald dragonfly, the rarest Irish dragonfly, is confined to the park. It breeds in shallow pools in bogs.

The oak woods in the remote Glaism na Marbh valley are a stronghold for Formica lugubris Zett., a wood ant species that is rare both in the Killarney woods and in Ireland as a whole.

The Kerry slug (Geomalacus maculosus) is a hiberno-lusitanean species. It emerges in Killarney's frequent wet weather to graze on lichens on rocks and tree trunks. It is reputedly the only slug capable of rolling itself into a ball. It is on both Annex II and Annex IV of the EU Habitats Directive.

== Conservation threats ==
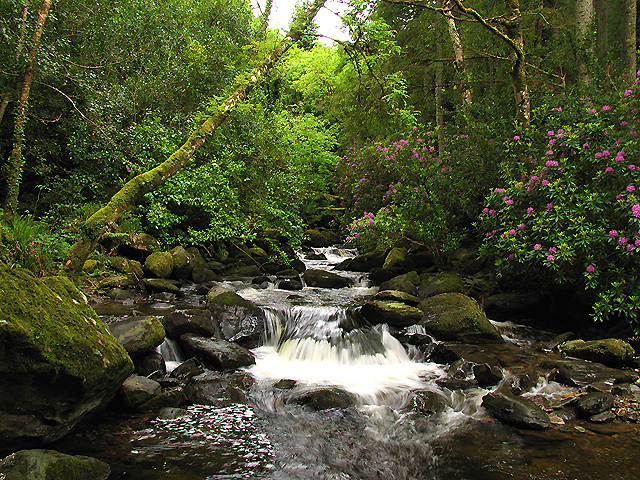
Wild rhododendrons growing beside Owengarriff river

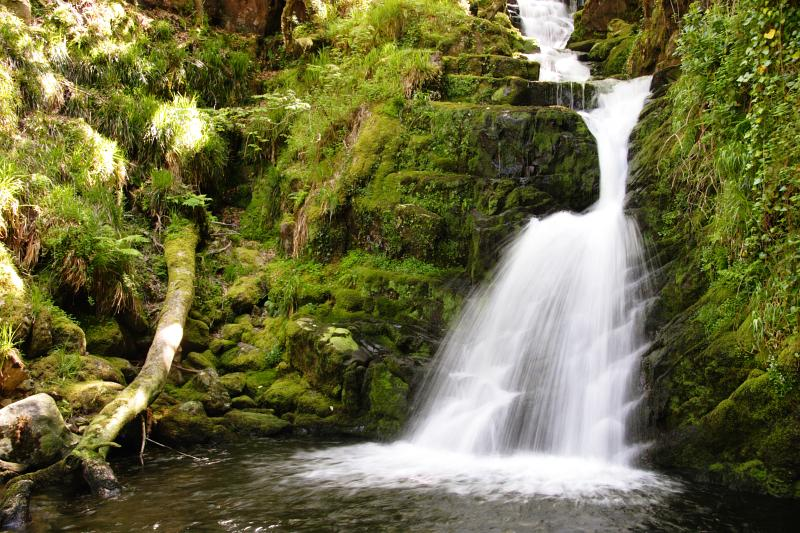
O'Sullivan's Cascade

The park has a number of conservation and management challenges. One of these is the park's proximity to Killarney town, one of Ireland's best known tourist destinations. Killarney has hundreds of thousands of visitors every year. Most of these visitors spend time in the park. Careful management is needed to ensure minimal conflict between conservation and recreation.

The past introduction of several exotic species to the park is an additional human influence on the area. These species have damaged the natural ecosystems of Killarney. The most notable of these species are the common rhododendron (Rhododendron ponticum), which has infested large areas of the National Park, and sika deer, which overgraze the woodland floor and pose a potential threat to the genetic integrity of the native red deer. Both rhododendron and sika deer can have an adverse effect on the native flora by inhibiting regeneration. A more recent, accidental, introduction is the American mink, which is now firmly established in the park alongside the native otter. Extinctions caused by humans include the wolf (Canis lupus L.) and the golden eagle (Aquila chrysaetos L.).

Fires caused by human activity occur with some frequency in the park. Despite the wet climate, they can spread quite rapidly to cover large areas. These fires rarely penetrate areas covered by dense woodlands, but they do burn readily through stands of open woodland. The park was damaged extensively by fires in April 2021.

The main land use within the site is grazing by sheep. Deer grazing is also common. The woods in the park are currently severely overgrazed by sika deer. Grazing has caused damage to many terrestrial habitats, causing heath and blanket bogs to degrade and preventing woodland regeneration. In the upland areas erosion caused by grazing is exacerbated by the exposed nature of the terrain. Pressures from native grazers like red deer and Irish hare have increased since their main natural predators, the wolf and golden eagle, became extinct. Grazing and disturbance of vegetation greatly aids the spread of rhododendron.

The common rhododendron is perhaps the greatest threat to the ecology of the park. It is an evergreen shrub with a natural distribution in the Mediterranean and Black Sea areas. Rhododendrons died out in Ireland because of climate change thousands of years ago. It was introduced to the Killarney area during the 19th century, and rapidly took hold. It has spread through its large numbers of very small easily dispersed seeds. It shades the ground flora and so prevents the regeneration of native woody species. More than 6.5 square kilometres (1,600 acres) of the park are now completely infested. They have had a devastating effect in certain parts of the park. As light cannot penetrate the dense thickets of rhododendrons, very few plants can live beneath it. The park's oak woods are in long-term danger because they cannot regenerate. There is a policy of control and eradication of rhododendrons in the park.

== Tourism ==
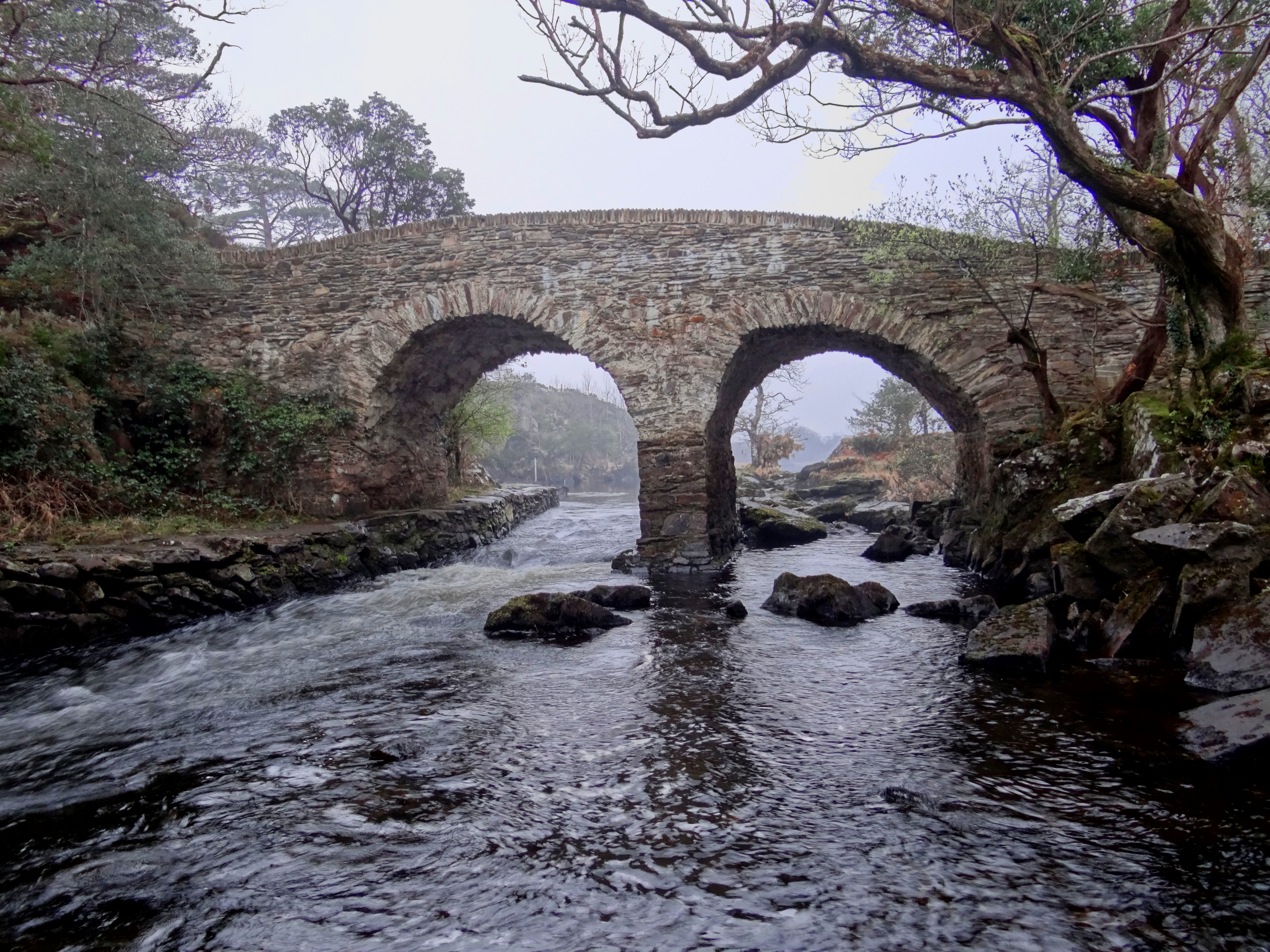
Old Weir Bridge – One of many sights in the park

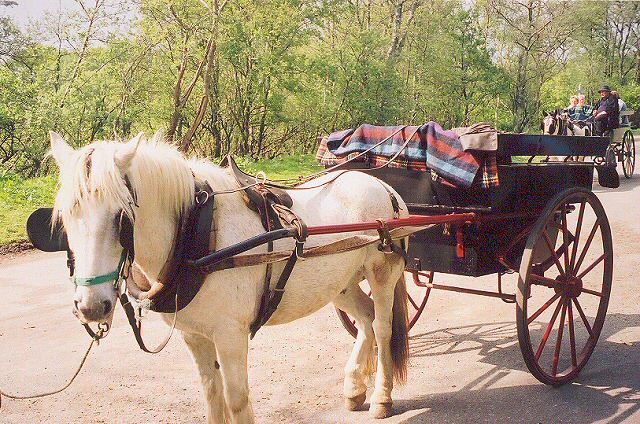
Jaunting cars bring tourists around the park

The park is open for tourism year-round. There is a visitor and education centre at Killarney House. Visitor attractions in the park include Dinis Cottage, Knockreer Demesne, Inisfallen Island, Ladies View, the Meeting of the Waters and the Old Weir Bridge, Muckross Abbey, Muckross House, the Muckross Peninsula, the Old Kenmare Road, O'Sullivan's Cascade, Ross Castle and Ross Island, Tomies Oakwood, and Torc Waterfall. There is a network of surfaced paths in the Knockreer, Muckross, and Ross Island areas that can be used by cyclists and walkers. The Old Kenmare Road and the track around Tomies Oakwood have views over Lough Leane and Killarney. Boat trips on the lakes are available.

Muckross House is a Victorian mansion, close to Muckross Lake's eastern shore, beneath the backdrop of Mangerton and Torc mountains. The house has now been restored and attracts more than 250,000 visitors a year. Muckross Gardens are famous for their collection of rhododendrons, hybrids and azaleas, and exotic trees. Muckross Traditional Farms is a working farm project that recreates Irish rural life in the 1930s, prior to electrification. Knockreer House is used as the National Park Education Centre.

== See also ==
- Aghadoe
- Kenmare House
- Killarney House
- Killarney
- Lakes of Killarney
- List of national parks of the Republic of Ireland
- Mountains of East Kerry
- Muckross Abbey
- Muckross House
- Purple Mountains
- Ross Castle
