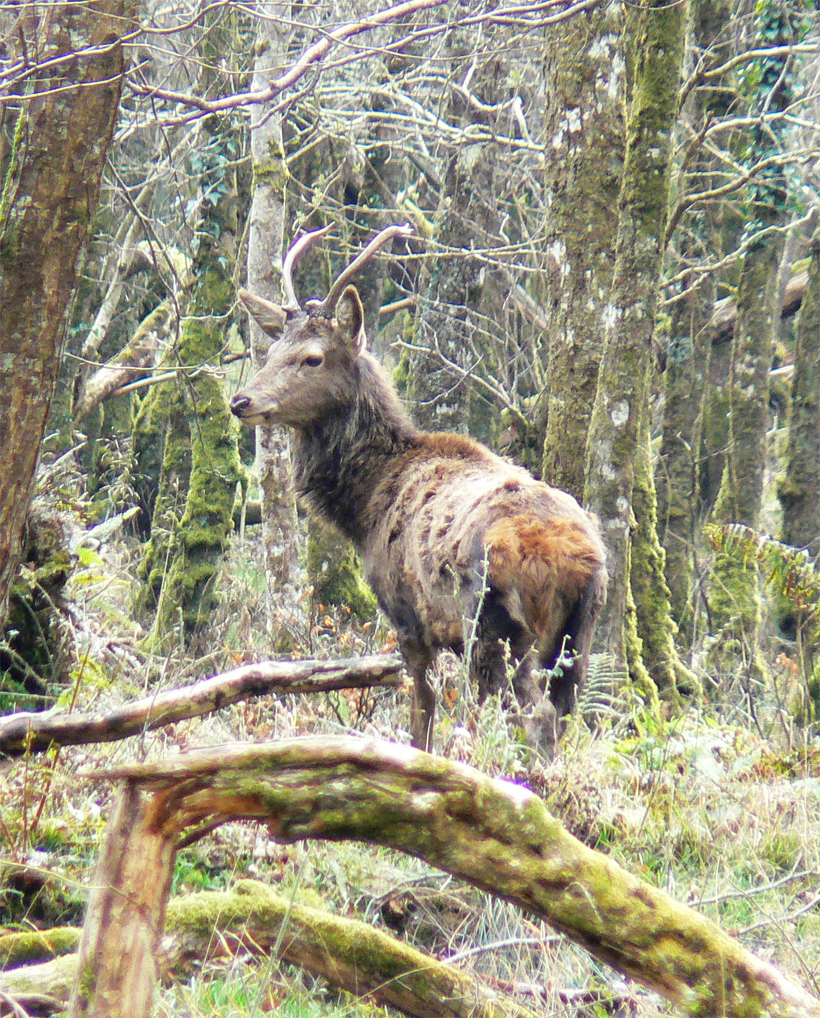

Scientific classification
- Kingdom: Animalia
- Phylum: Chordata
- Class: Mammalia
- Order: Artiodactyla
- Family: Cervidae
- Genus: Cervus
- Species: C. elaphus
- Subspecies: C. e. hibernicus

Trinomial name
- Cervus elaphus hibernicus (Stejneger, 1893)

= Irish red deer =

Subspecies of mammal

The Irish red deer (Cervus elaphus hibernicus) is a subspecies of the red deer (Cervus elaphus) that is native to Ireland. Their current distribution is believed to be that of the red deer in Killarney National Park.

== Details ==
Opinions are still mixed if it is its own subspecies or not, for DNA analysis shows traits of another subspecies of red deer native to Ireland, being the Scottish red deer (Cervus elaphus scoticus). The Irish red deer may have broken off from the Scottish red deer around 5,000 years ago, but this has not been proven. Only a few individuals have been found with the same traits of the subspecies.
