= Lakes of Killarney =

Lakes in County Kerry, Ireland

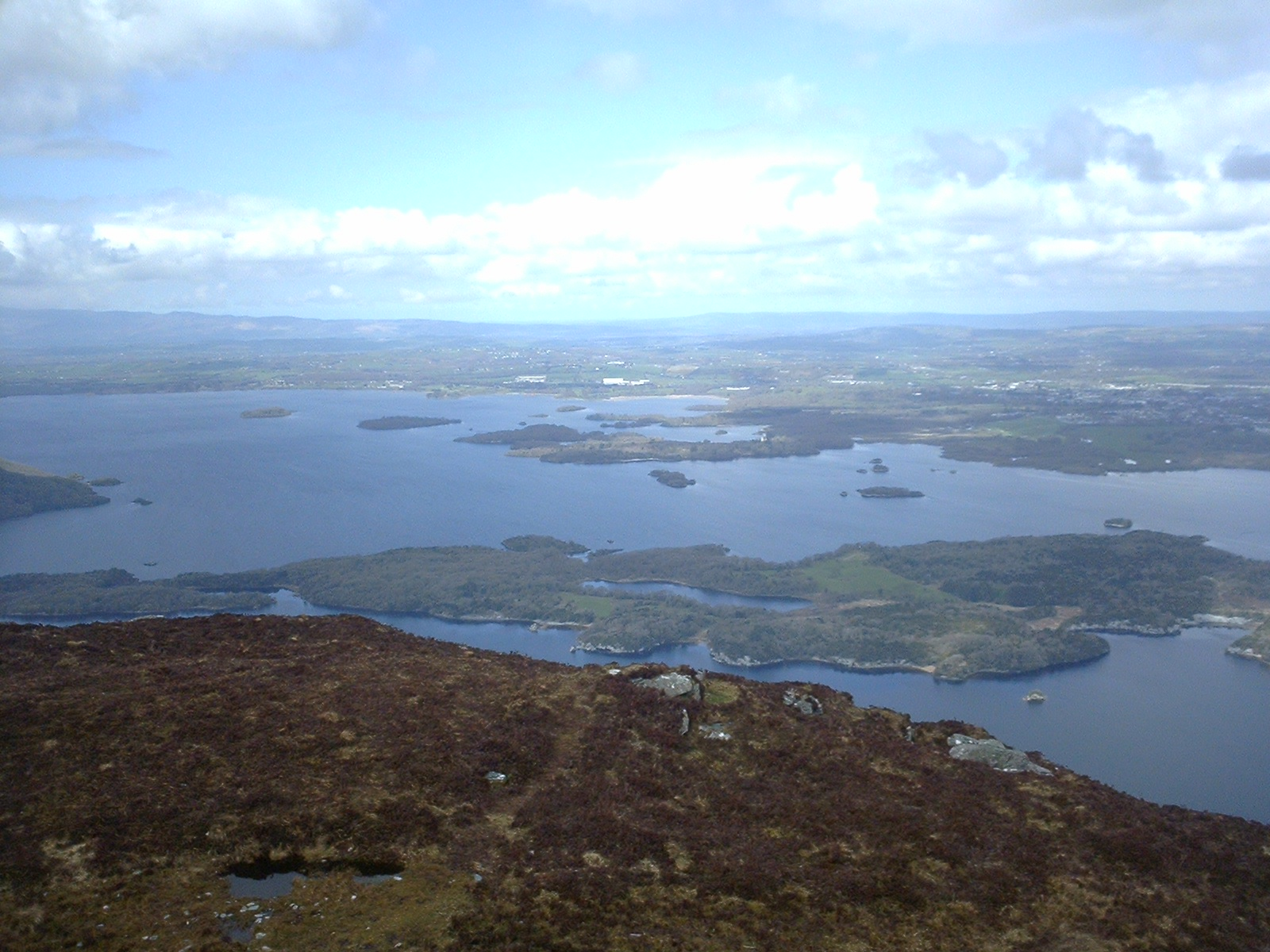
- The Lakes of Killarney from nearby Torc Mountain

- Location within Ireland
- Location: Killarney, County Kerry
- Coordinates: 52°2′30″N 9°33′0″W
- Type: Lake
- Basin countries: Ireland
- Average depth: 13.4 m (44 ft)
- Max. depth: 75 m (246 ft)
- Surface elevation: 20 m (66 ft)
- Islands: Innisfallen

The Lakes of Killarney are a scenic attraction located in Killarney National Park near Killarney, County Kerry, in Ireland. They consist of three lakes: Lough Leane, Muckross Lake (also called Middle Lake) and Upper Lake.

== Surroundings ==
The lakes sit in a low valley some 20 m (66 ft) above sea level. They are surrounded by the rugged slopes of MacGillycuddy's Reeks. Notable mountains in the range include Carrauntoohil, which, at 1,038 metres (3,406 ft) is Ireland's highest mountain, Purple Mountain, at 832 metres (2,730 ft), Mangerton Mountain, at 843 metres (2,766 ft), and Torc Mountain, at 535 metres (1,755 ft).

The N71 road from Killarney to Kenmare passes a viewpoint called Ladies View which offers a view of the lakes and valleys. On the occasion of Queen Victoria's visit in 1861, the point was apparently chosen by the queen's ladies-in-waiting as the finest in the land; hence the name.

== Lough Leane ==
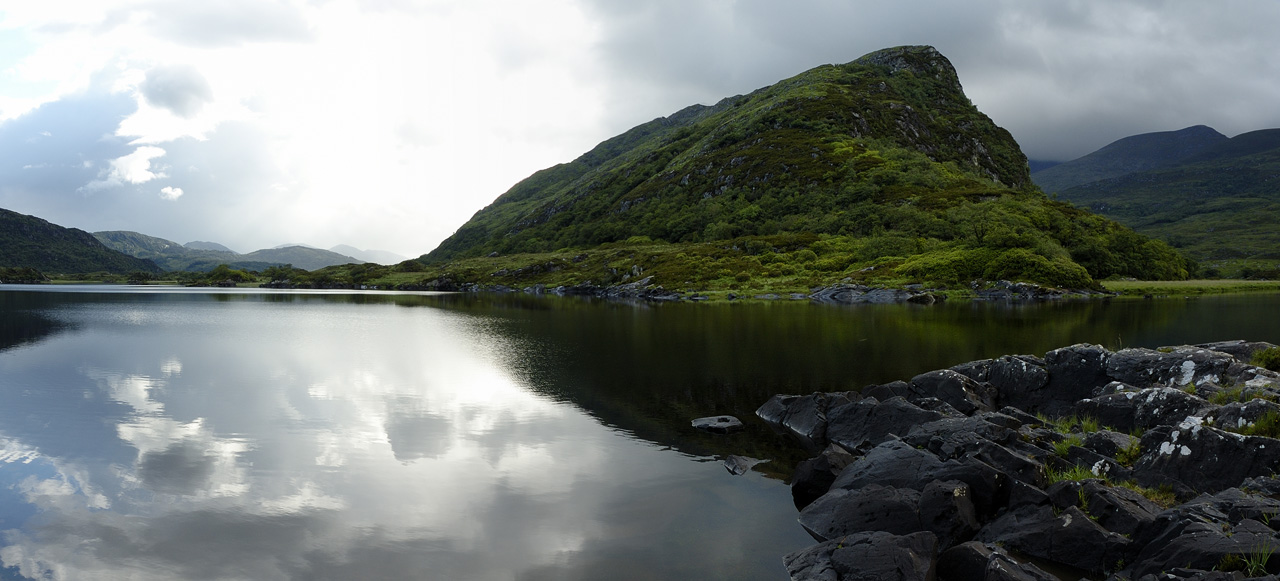
Lough Leane

Lough Leane (from Irish Loch Léin 'lake of learning') is the largest and northernmost of the three lakes, approximately 19 square kilometres (4,700 acres) in size. It is also the largest body of fresh water in the region. The River Laune drains Lough Leane to the north-west towards Killorglin and into Dingle Bay.

Leane is dotted with small forested islands, including Innisfallen, which holds the remains of the ruined Innisfallen Abbey. On the eastern edge of the lake, Ross Island, more properly a peninsula, was the site of some of the earliest Copper Age metalwork in prehistoric Ireland. Ross Castle, a 15th-century keep, sits on the eastern shore of the lake, north of the Ross Island peninsula.

== Muckross Lake ==
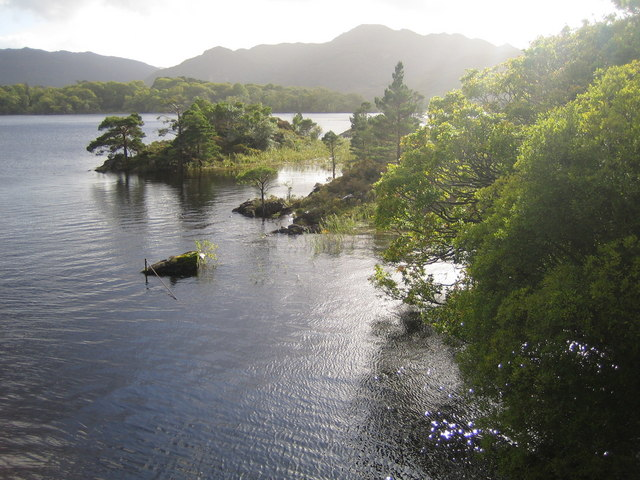
Muckross Lake viewed from Brickeen Bridge

Also known as Middle Lake or Torc Lake, Muckross is just south of Lough Leane. The two are separated by a small peninsula, crossed by a stone arched bridge called Brickeen Bridge. It is Ireland's deepest lake, reaching to 75 metres (246 ft) in parts. A paved hiking trail of approximately 10 km (6.2 mi) circles the lake.

== Upper Lake ==
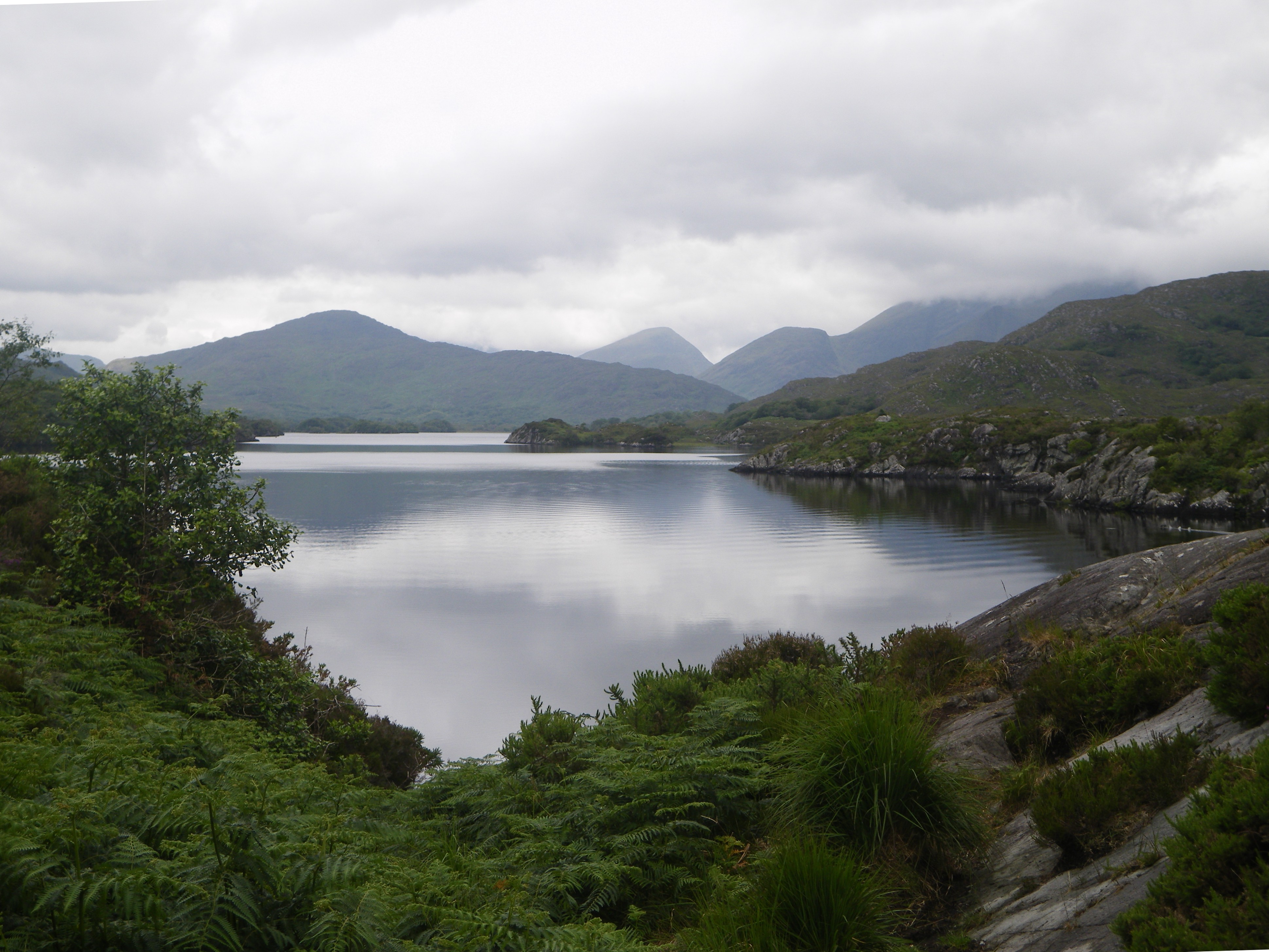
Upper Lake

The Upper Lake is the smallest of the three lakes, and the southernmost. It is separated from the others by a winding channel some 4 km (2.5 mi) long.

== Folklore ==
According to folklore, the lakes were the haunt of Kate Kearney, who is said to have sought there O'Donaghue, an enchanted chieftain, and to have died in madness. Kearney is the subject of Letitia Elizabeth Landon's poetical illustration to a view of The Upper Lake of Killarney. by William Henry Bartlett, and in a further Landon poem, Kate is Craz'd., which accompanies a picture by Joseph John Jenkins. This Kate Kearney should not be confused with the lady who provided refreshment at what is now Kate Kearney's Cottage at the Gap of Dunloe.

== Gallery ==
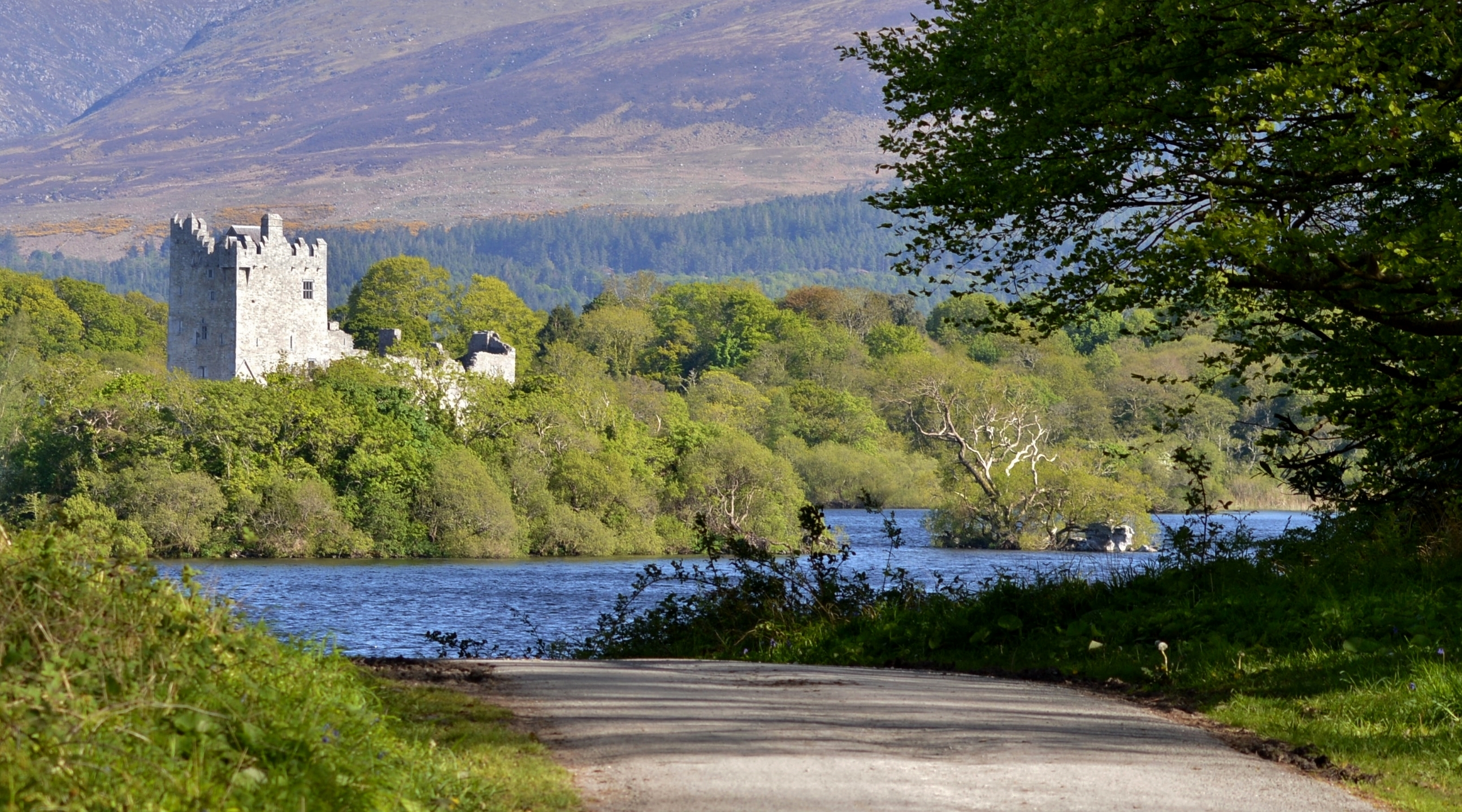
Ross Castle visible across Lough Leane

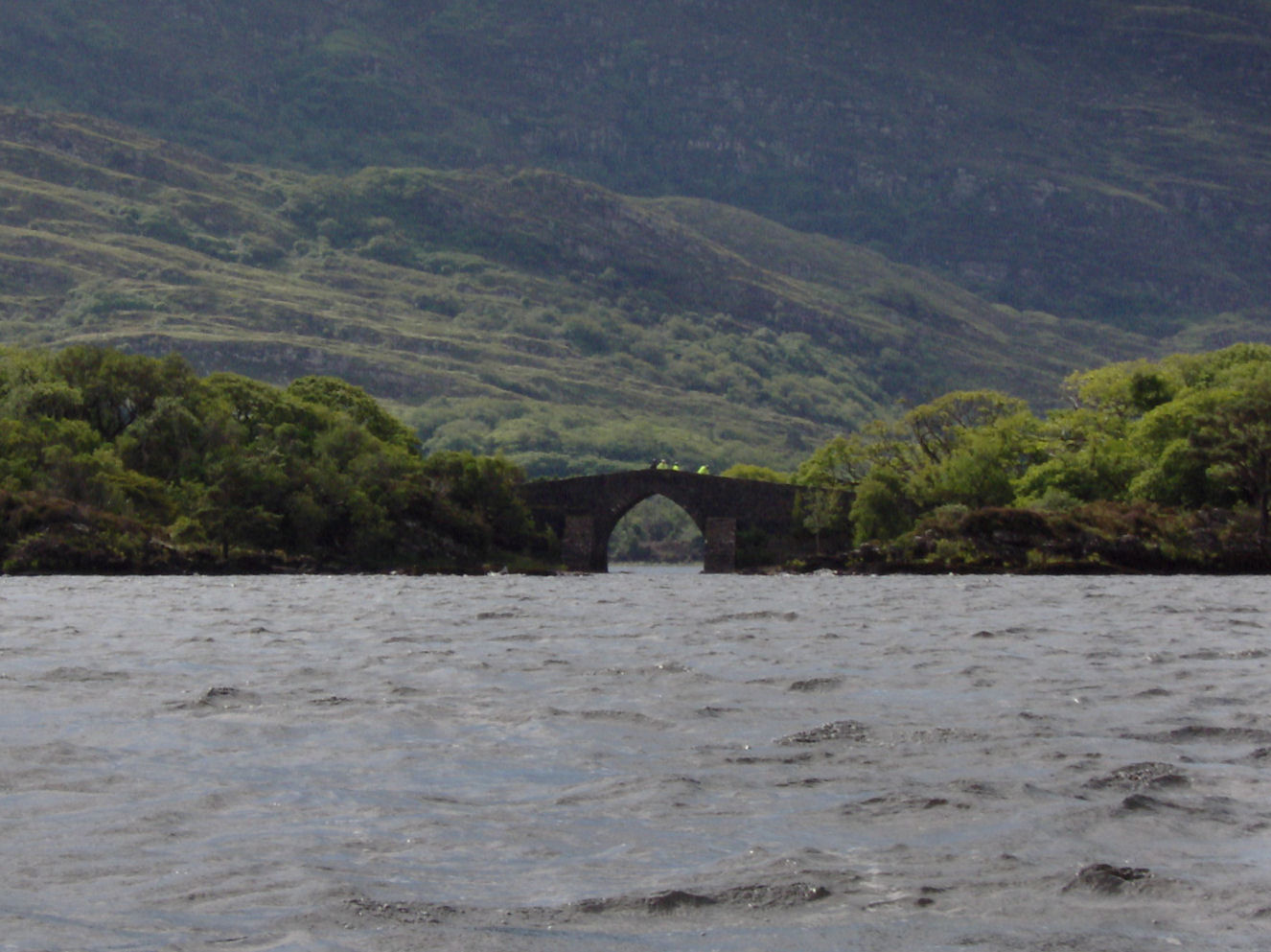
Brickeen Bridge, where Lough Leane and Muckross Lake meet

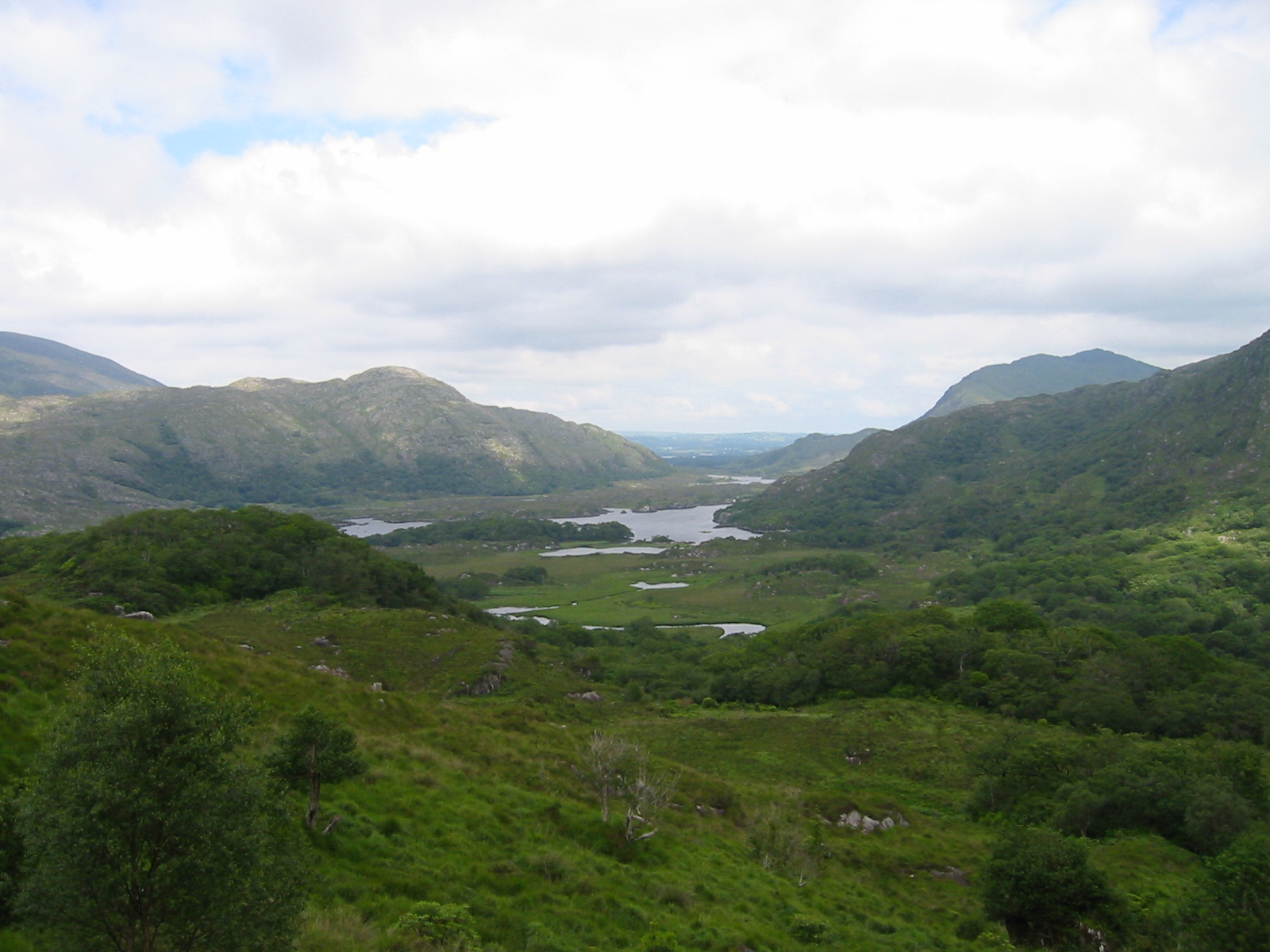
The lakes as viewed from Ladies View

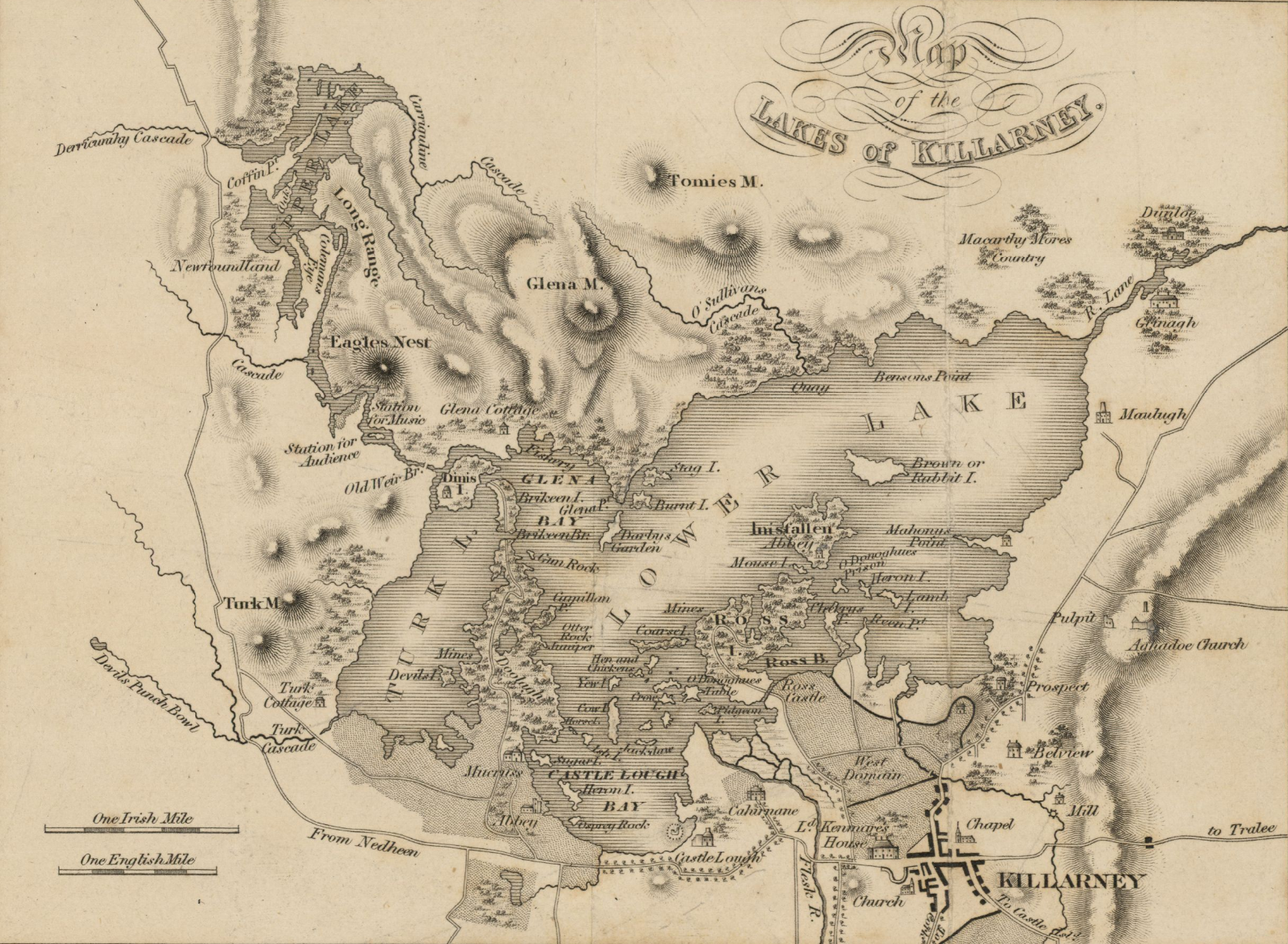
Hand-drawn map of the Lakes by French artist Alphonse Dousseau, between 1830 and 1869

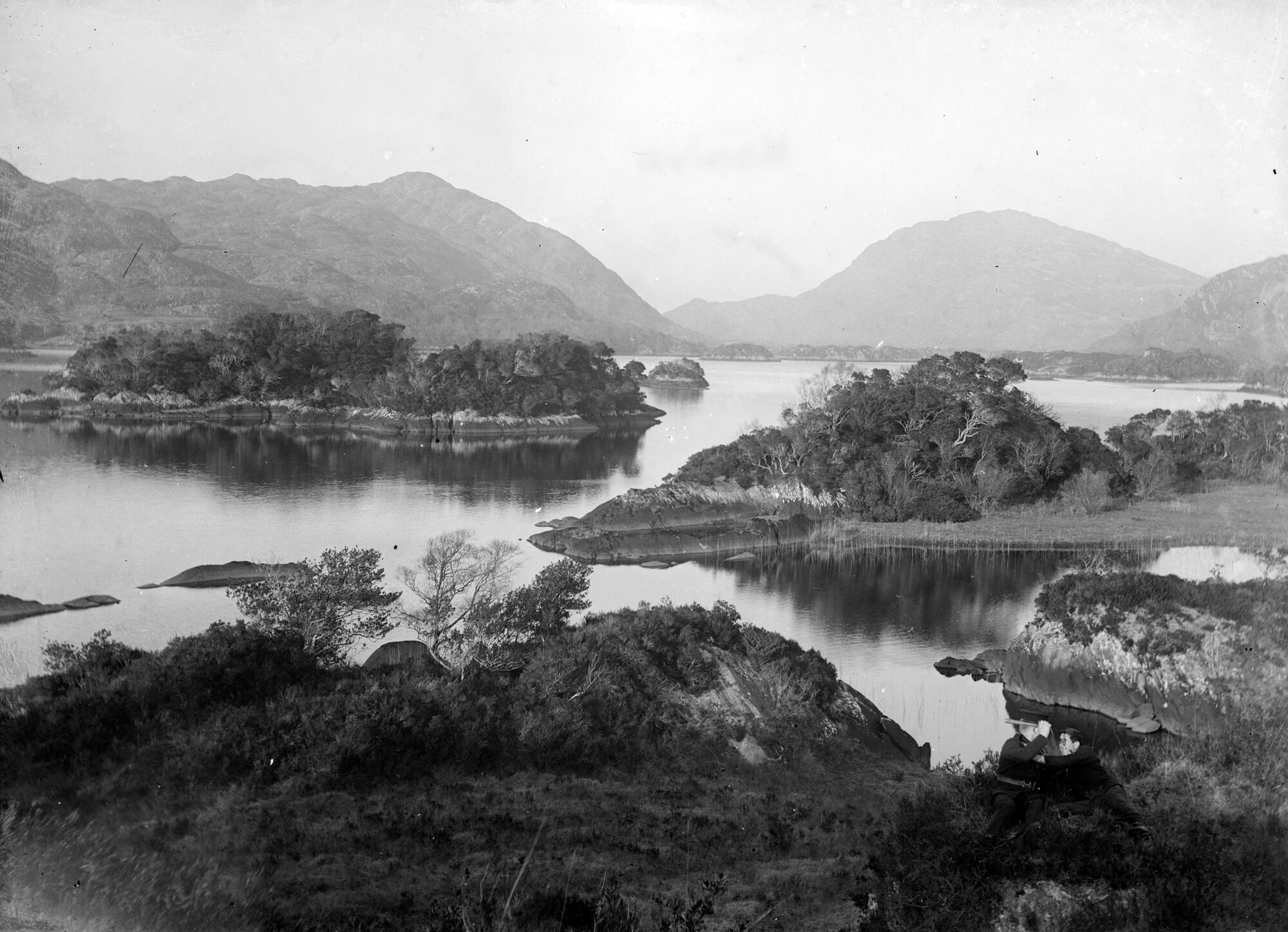
Photograph of Upper Lake published by Fergus O'Connor circa 1920 with commotion in bottom right

== See also ==
- List of loughs of Ireland
