= Derrycunnihy Wood =

Woodland and nature reserve in County Kerry, Ireland

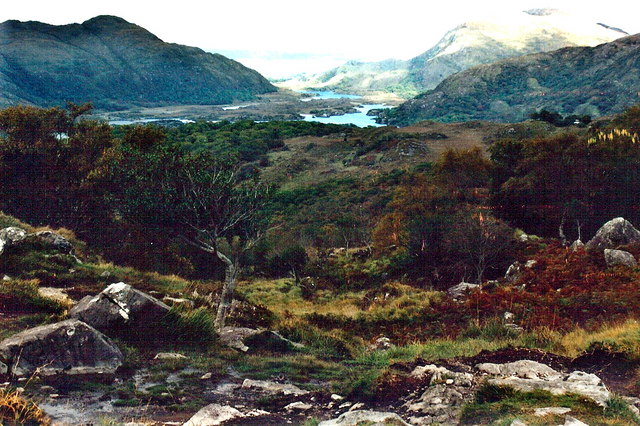
- View to northeast off N71

- Location within Ireland
- Type: National
- Location: County Kerry
- Coordinates: 51°58′19″N 9°35′35″W
- Area: 336 acres (135.97 ha)
- Operator: Coillte
- Status: Open all year

Derrycunnihy Wood is a national nature reserve of approximately 336 acres (1.36 km^{2}) located in County Kerry, Ireland. It is managed by Coillte.

== Features ==
Derrycunnihy Wood, also known as Derrycunihy Wood, was legally protected as a national nature reserve by the Irish government in 1989. The reserve is owned by Coillte.

The name Derrycunnihy means "wood of the rabbits", despite a lack of rabbits in the area today. The reserve is located in Killarney National Park. It is believed to be one of the oldest and most natural native sessile oak woods in Ireland and the country's best example of a damp-climate oceanic wood with dense mosses and ferns. The reserve also contains lake shore and areas of bog. Two species of deer graze in the reserve, native red deer graze in winter on the open hills, and the Japanese sika deer which were introduced in the 18th century graze the woodland all year round, which results in areas of grass like lawn and a brown line under which all leaves and twigs have been eaten.
