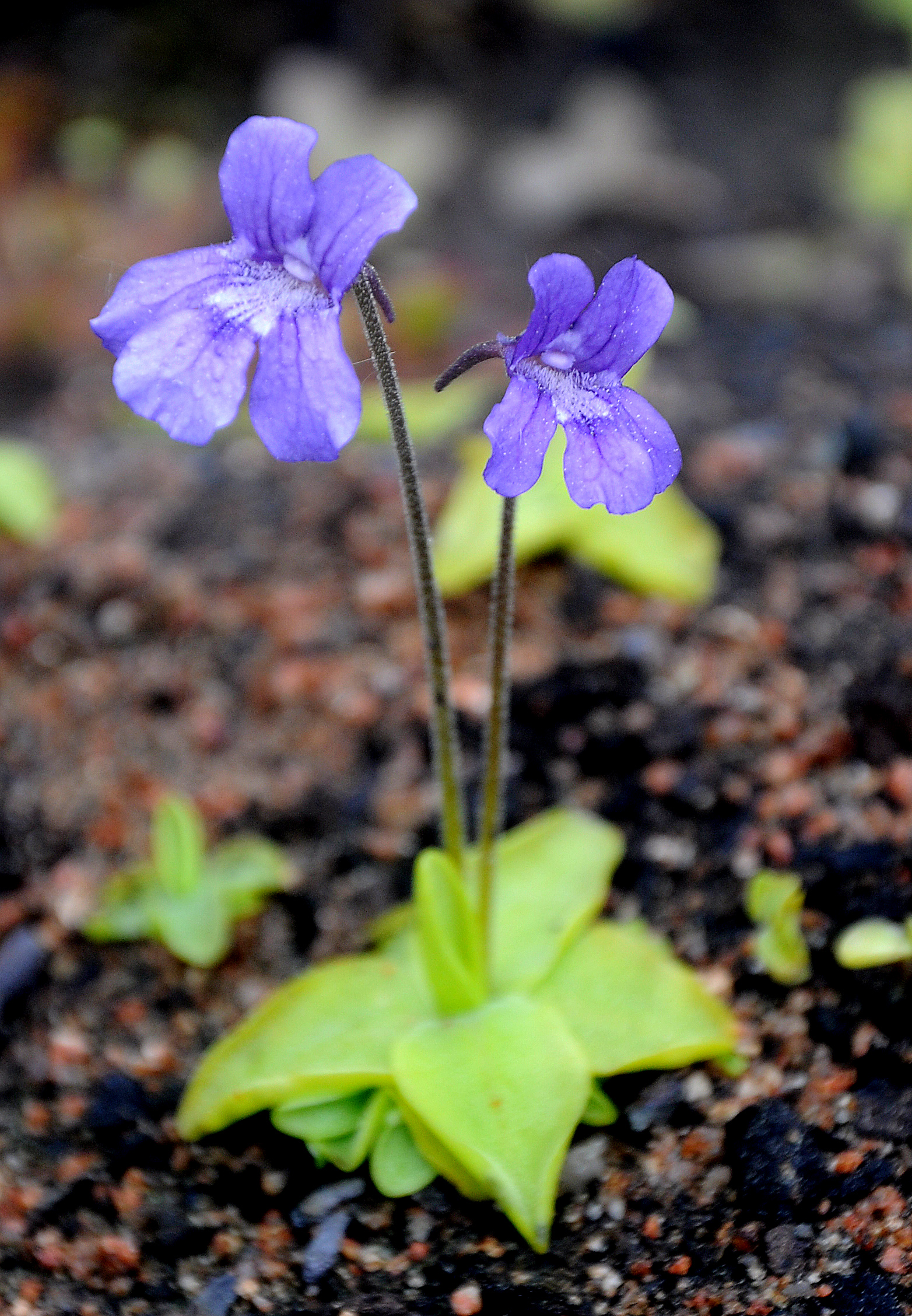

Scientific classification
- Kingdom: Plantae
- Clade: Tracheophytes
- Clade: Angiosperms
- Clade: Eudicots
- Clade: Asterids
- Order: Lamiales
- Family: Lentibulariaceae
- Genus: Pinguicula
- Species: P. grandiflora

Binomial name
- Pinguicula grandiflora Lam.

Synonyms
- Pinguicula vulgaris subsp. grandiflora (Lam.) Magnin, (1895); Pinguicula vulgaris f. grandiflora (Lam.) St.-Lag., (1881); Pinguicula vulgaris var. grandiflora (Lam.) Fr., (1845); Pinguicula vulgaris subsp. grandiflora (Lam.) Bonnier & Layens, (1894)

= Pinguicula grandiflora =

Species of plant

Pinguicula grandiflora, commonly known as the large-flowered butterwort, is a temperate insectivorous plant in the Lentibulariaceae family. One distinguishing feature of the species is its flower, which is much larger than the average for the genus.

== Distribution ==
The plant is native to parts of Europe; such as France, Ireland, Spain and Switzerland, It is not native to Great Britain, but has been introduced in a few places in England and Wales. It has also been introduced to Czechoslovakia.

== Subspecies ==
There are 2 known subspecies;

- Pinguicula grandiflora subsp. grandiflora
- Pinguicula grandiflora subsp. rosea (Mutel) Casper
