= Lough Leane =

Lake in County Kerry, Ireland

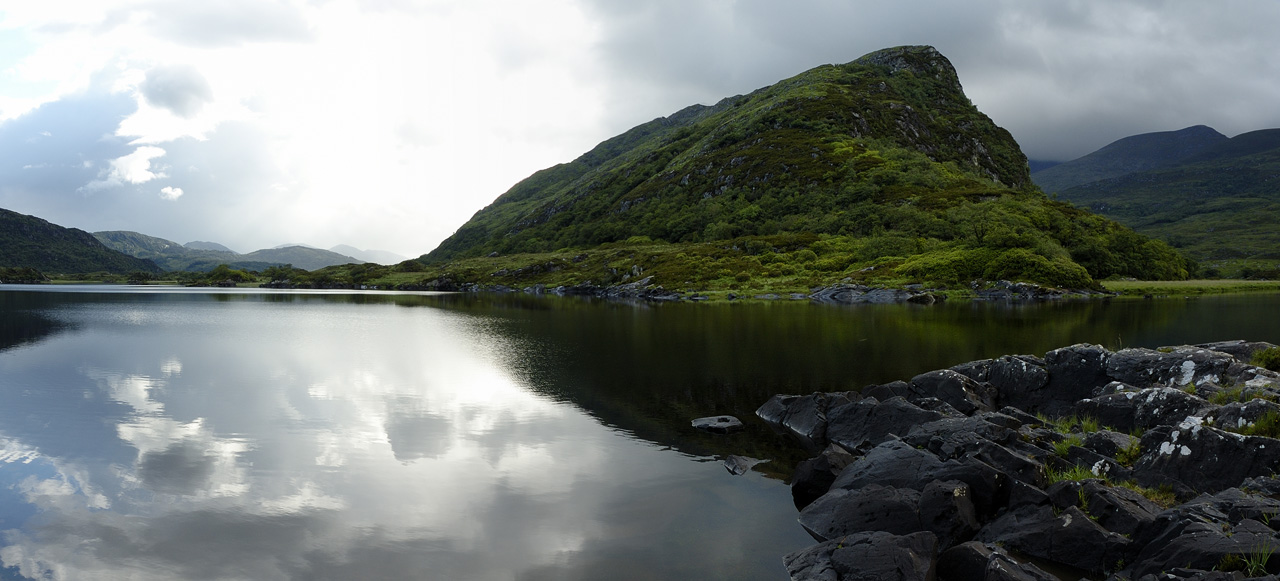

- Location within Ireland
- Location: Killarney, County Kerry
- Coordinates: 52°2′30″N 9°33′0″W
- Basin countries: Ireland
- Surface area: 4,700 acres (19 km^{2})
- Islands: Innisfallen

Lough Leane (/ˈleɪn/; from Irish Loch Léin 'lake of Léan', a personal name) is the largest of the three lakes of Killarney, in County Kerry. The River Laune flows from the lake into the Dingle Bay to the northwest.

== Etymology and history ==
Although the lake's name has been misinterpreted as meaning the "lake of learning" in reference to the monastery on Innisfallen, an island in the lake that was a centre of scholarship in the early Middle Ages, there is no linguistic evidence to support this belief. The lake takes its name from Léan Línfhiaclach, a character mentioned in the dindshenchas or place-lore tradition.

Another historic site, the tower house Ross Castle sits on Ross Island in the lake. Ross Island is rich in copper. Archaeological evidence suggests the island has been mined since the time of the Bronze Age Beaker People. Further studies have shown that copper mining in the British isles started there and later spread to the rest of Ireland, to Wales and beyond, following a west-east movement.

== Geography ==
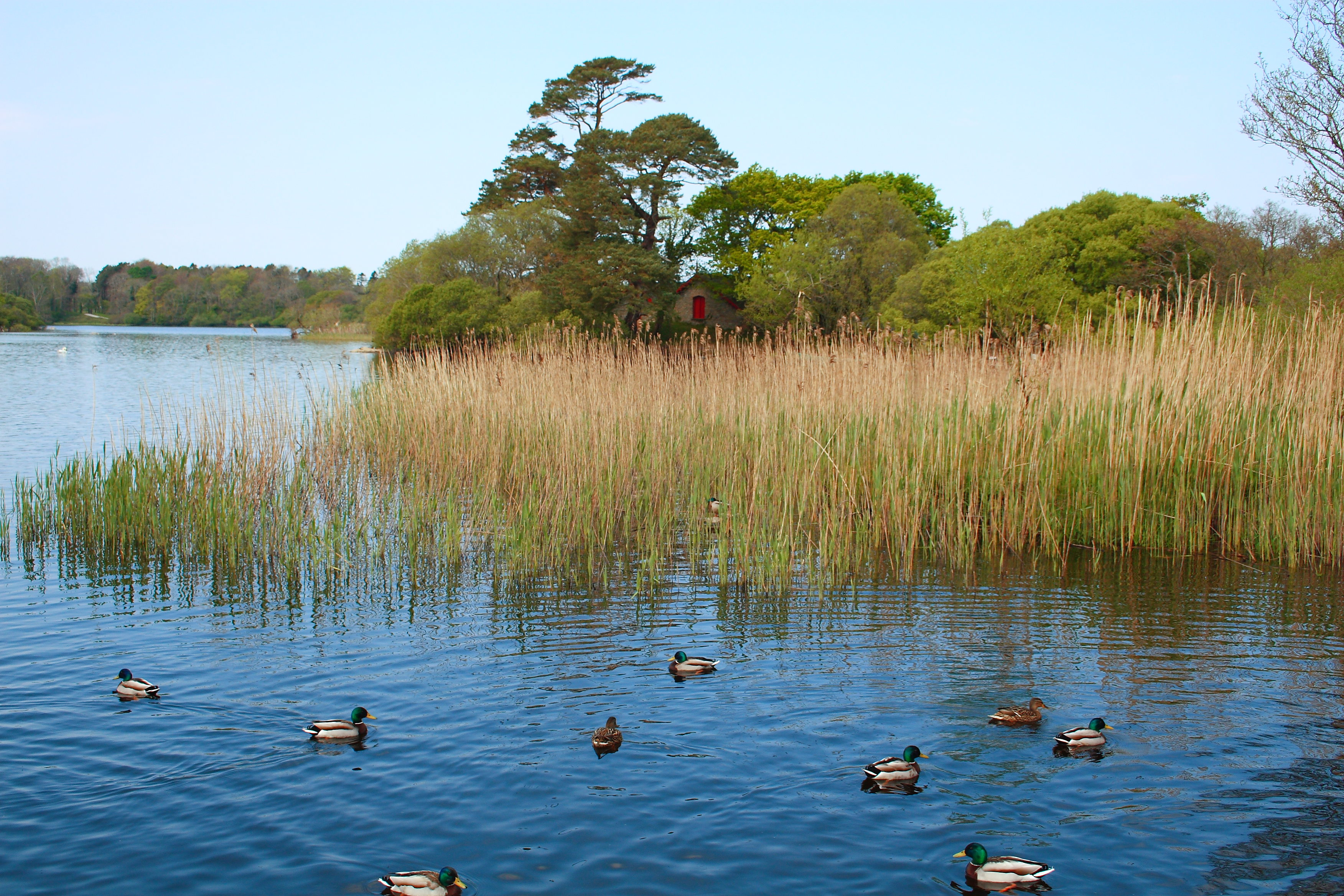
Ducks on Lough Leane

Lough Leane is approximately 19 square kilometres (4,700 acres) in size. It is also the largest body of fresh water in the region. It has become eutrophic as a result of phosphates from agricultural and domestic pollution entering Lough Leane Reedbed, an important habitat on the edge of Lough Leane. This nutrient enrichment has caused several algal blooms in recent years. The blooms have not yet had a severe effect on the lake's ecosystem. To prevent further pollution causing a permanent change in the lake's ecosystem, a review of land use in the catchment area is being carried out. Water quality in the lake appears to have improved since phosphates were removed from sewage in 1985.

== Wildlife ==
Lough Leane is a habitat for the critically endangered blunt-snouted Irish char (Salvelinus obtusus) and Killarney shad (Alosa killarnensis).

== See also ==
- Eóganacht Locha Léin, a ruling sept in the area during the Middle Ages
