= Ross Island, Killarney =

Peninsula in County Kerry, Ireland

Coordinates: 52.038°N 9.537°W

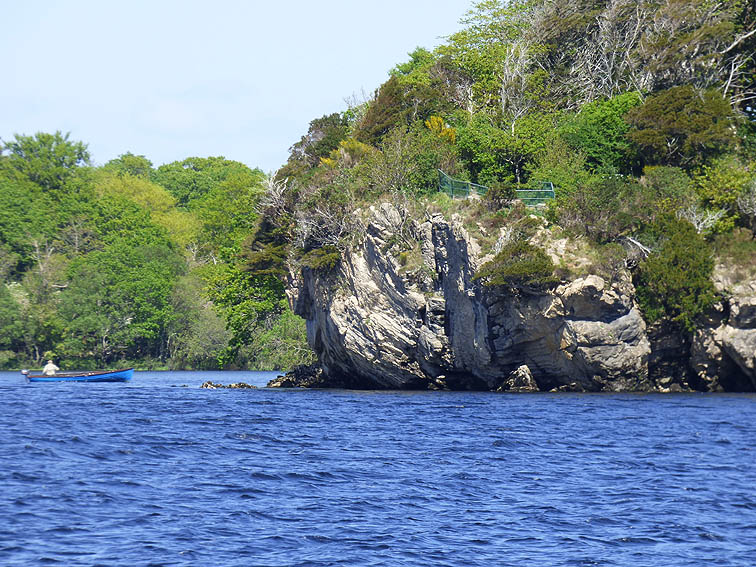
Governors Rock on Ross Island from Lough Leane

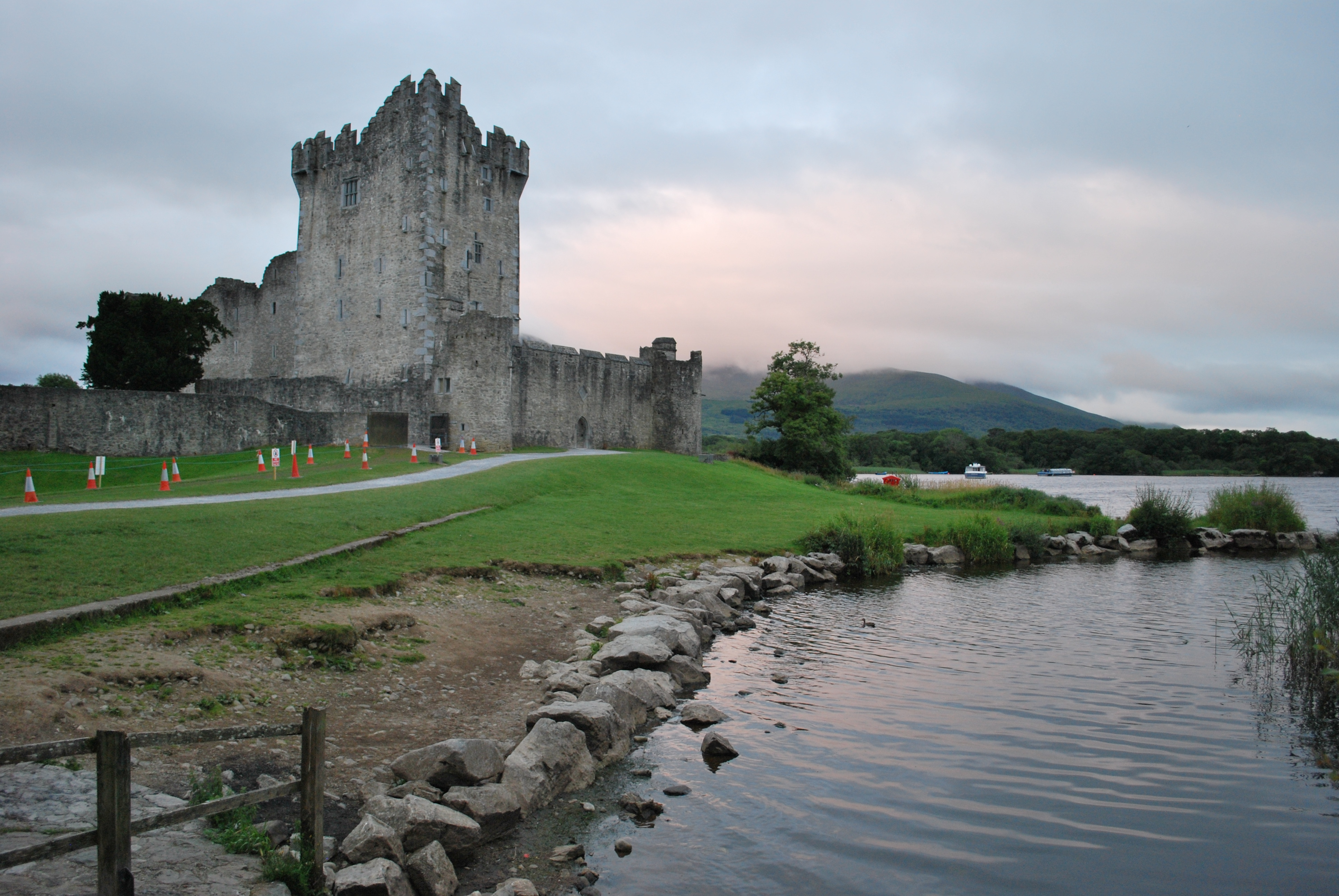
Ross Castle on Ross Island

Ross Island is a claw-shaped peninsula in Killarney National Park, County Kerry. Ross Castle is located here and it is also the site of abandoned copper mines, including some believed to be the earliest in north-western Europe. Copper extraction on the site is believed to be the source of the first known Irish Pre-Bronze Age metalwork, namely copper axe heads, halberds and knife/dagger blades dating from 2,400 - 2,200 BC. These finds have been distributed throughout Ireland and in the West of Britain - in South Britain the metalwork was imported from across the English Channel.

Excavations of the site have unearthed both mining operations and a smelting camp where the Copper ore was processed into a type of metal distinctive enough to be traced to these early tools. As there is no evidence that the complex technology had developed spontaneously, this early metallurgy would indicate contacts with mainland Europe - in particular, extending along the coastline from Spain through Normandy. The Ross island operation was associated with beaker pottery and continued until ca 1,900 BC.
