= Killarney =

Town in County Kerry, Ireland

Killarney Cill Airne (Irish)
- Town
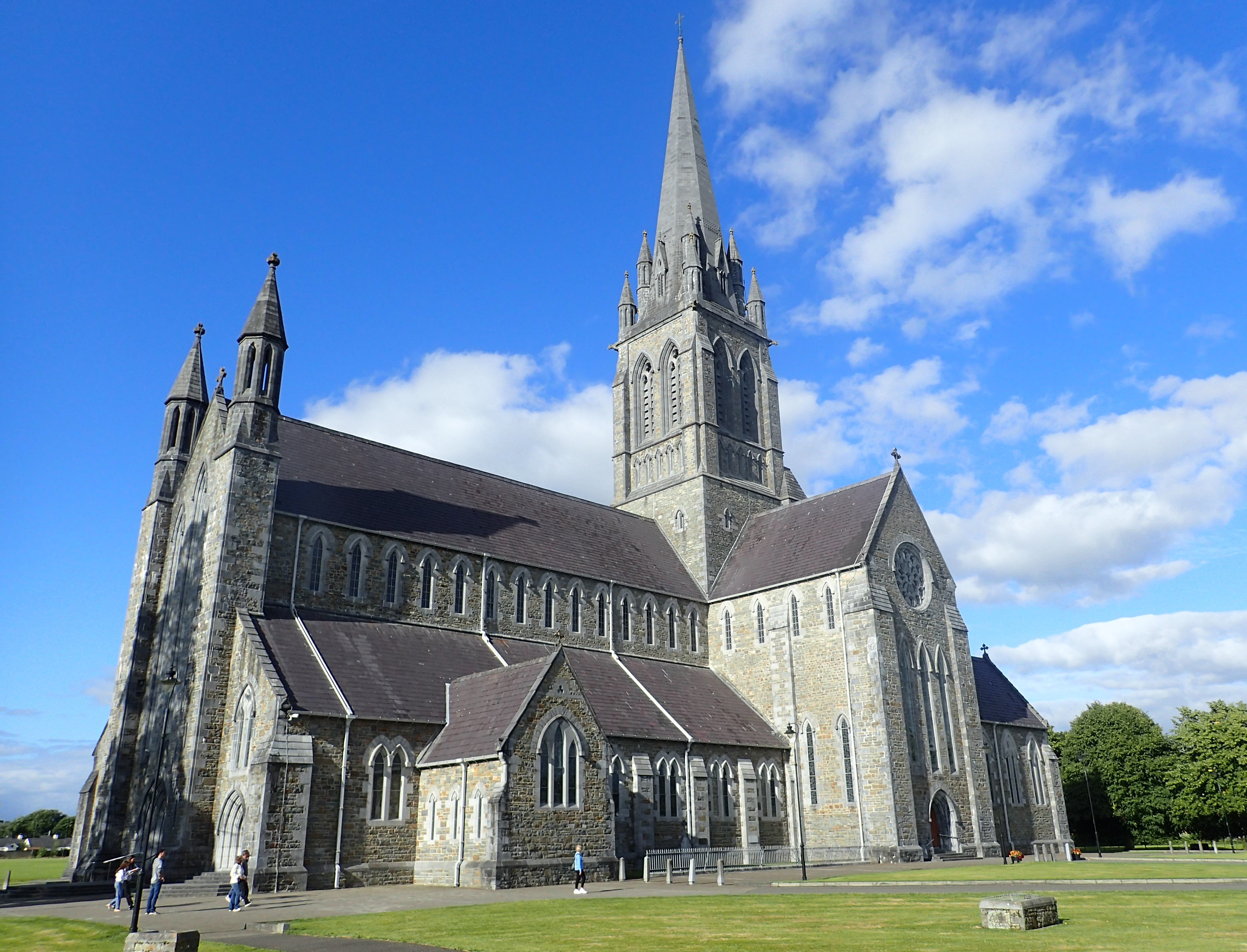
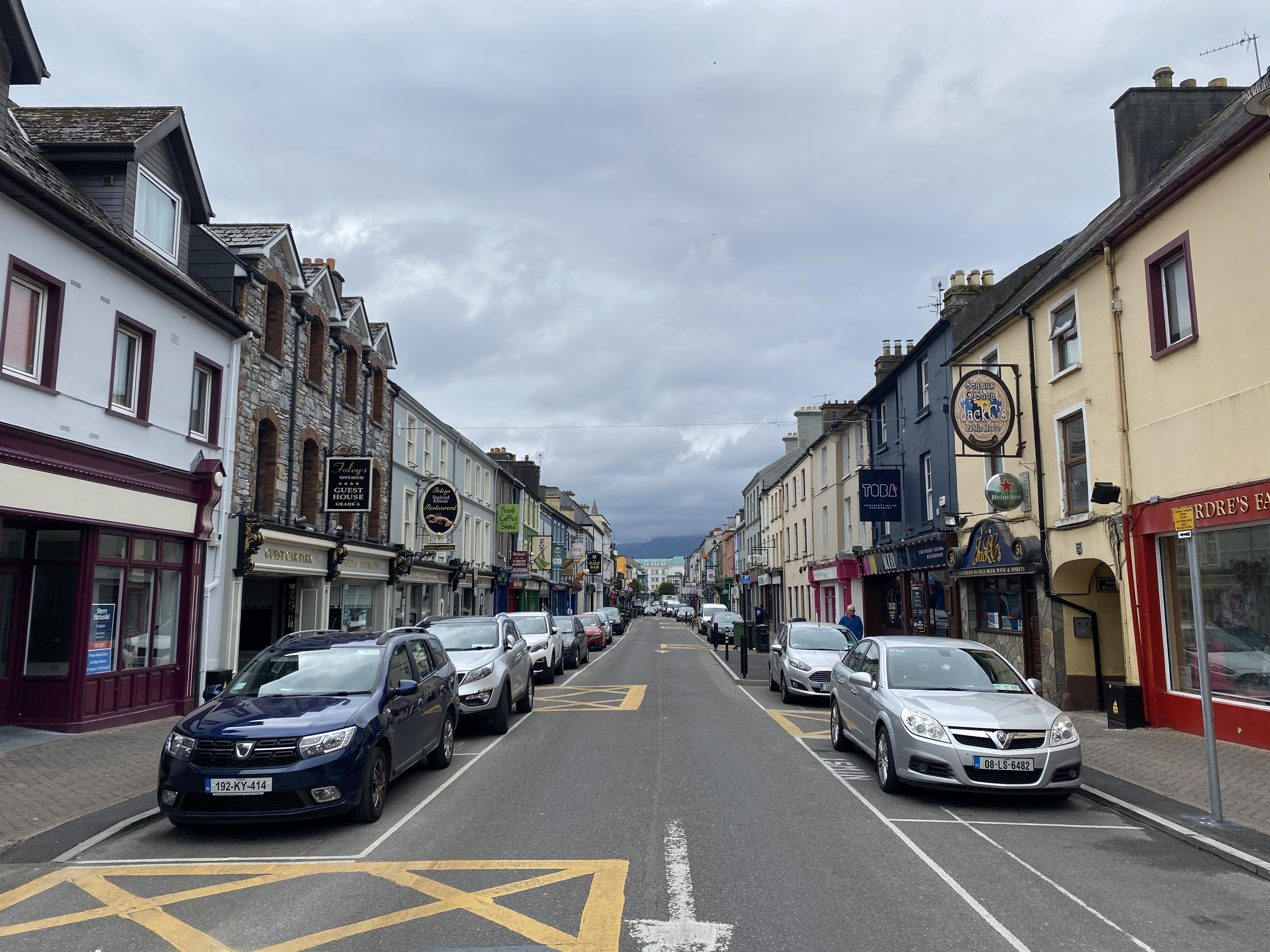
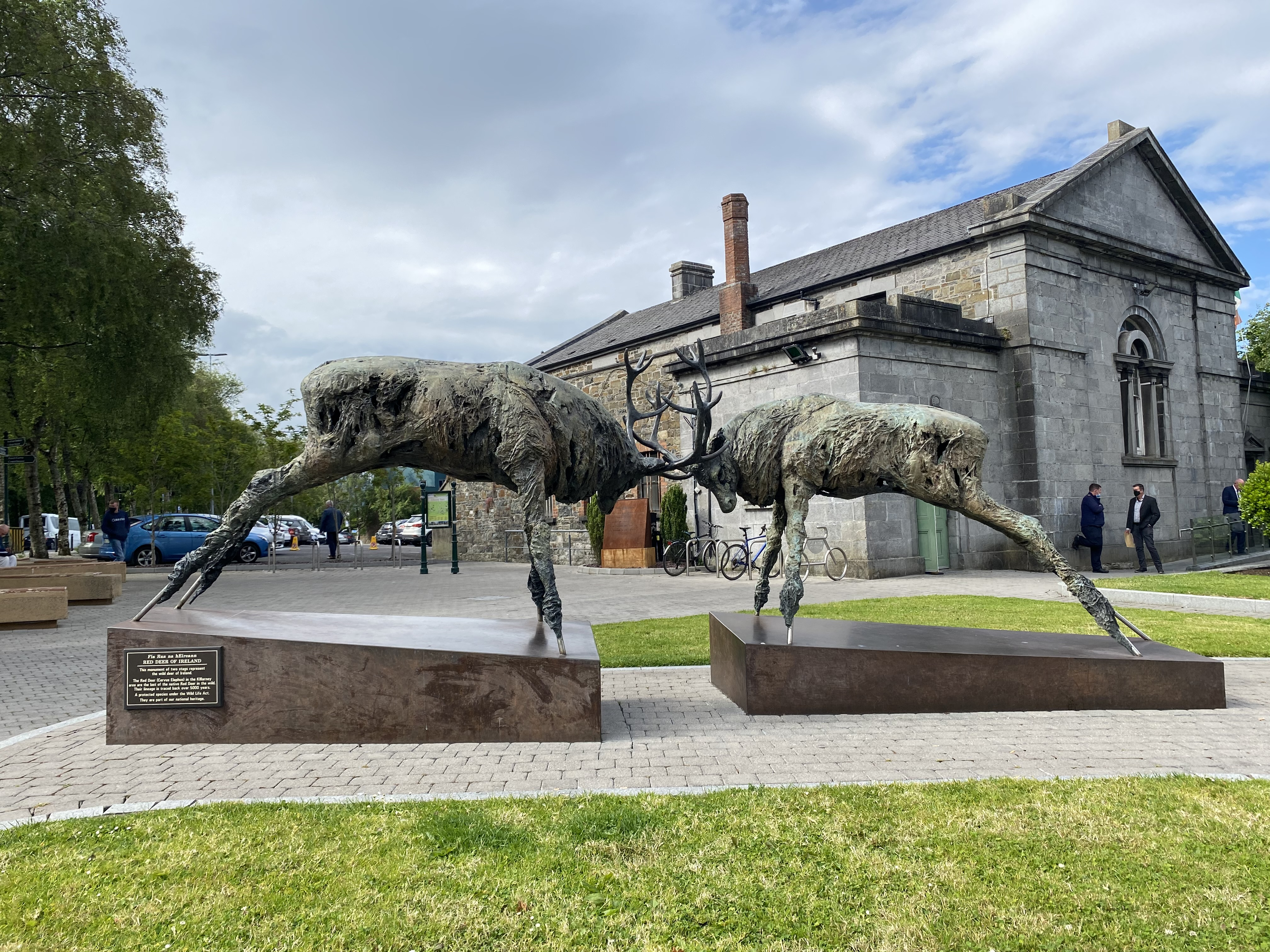
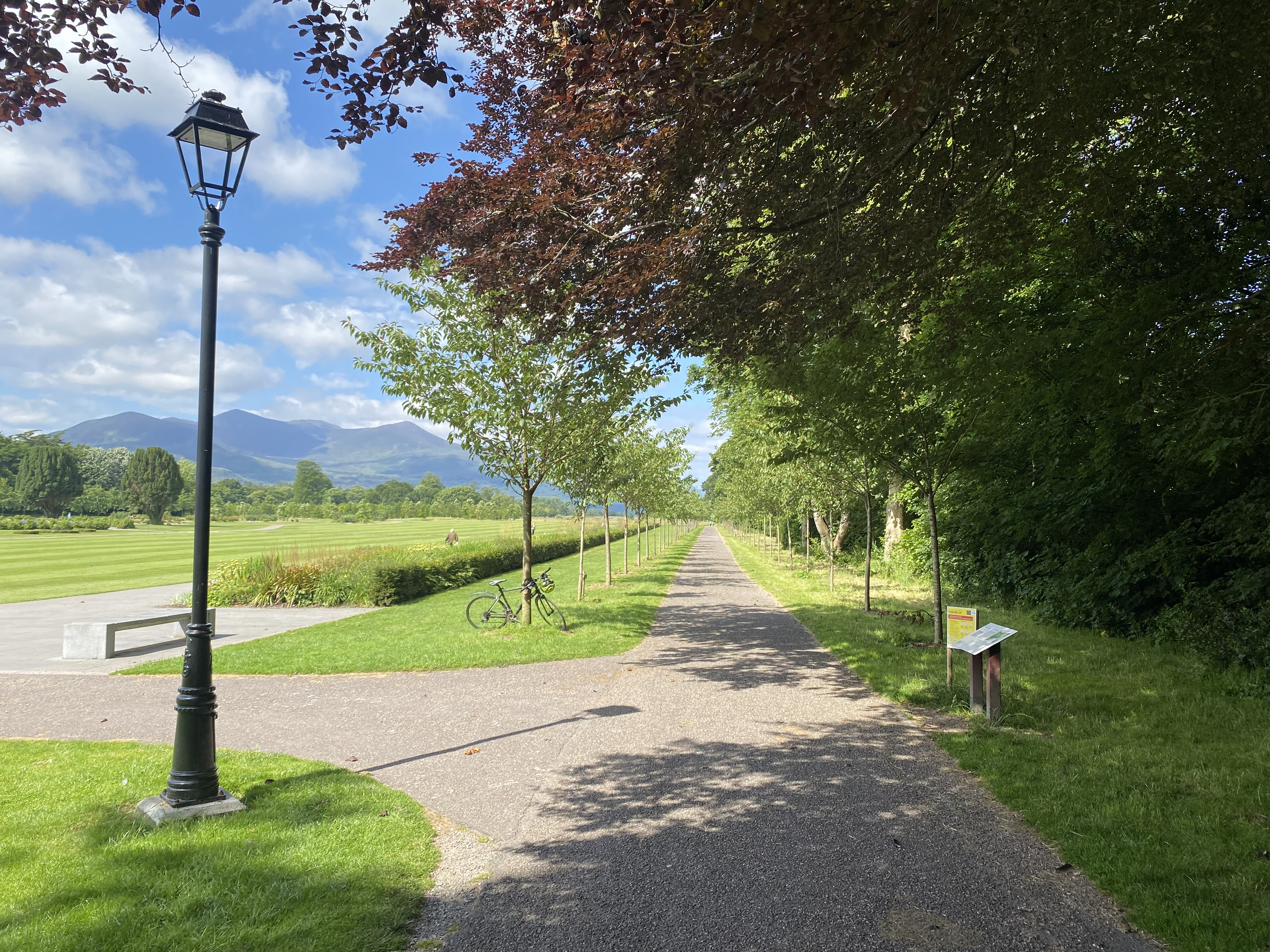
- St Mary's Cathedral High Street Red Deer sculpture Killarney House garden

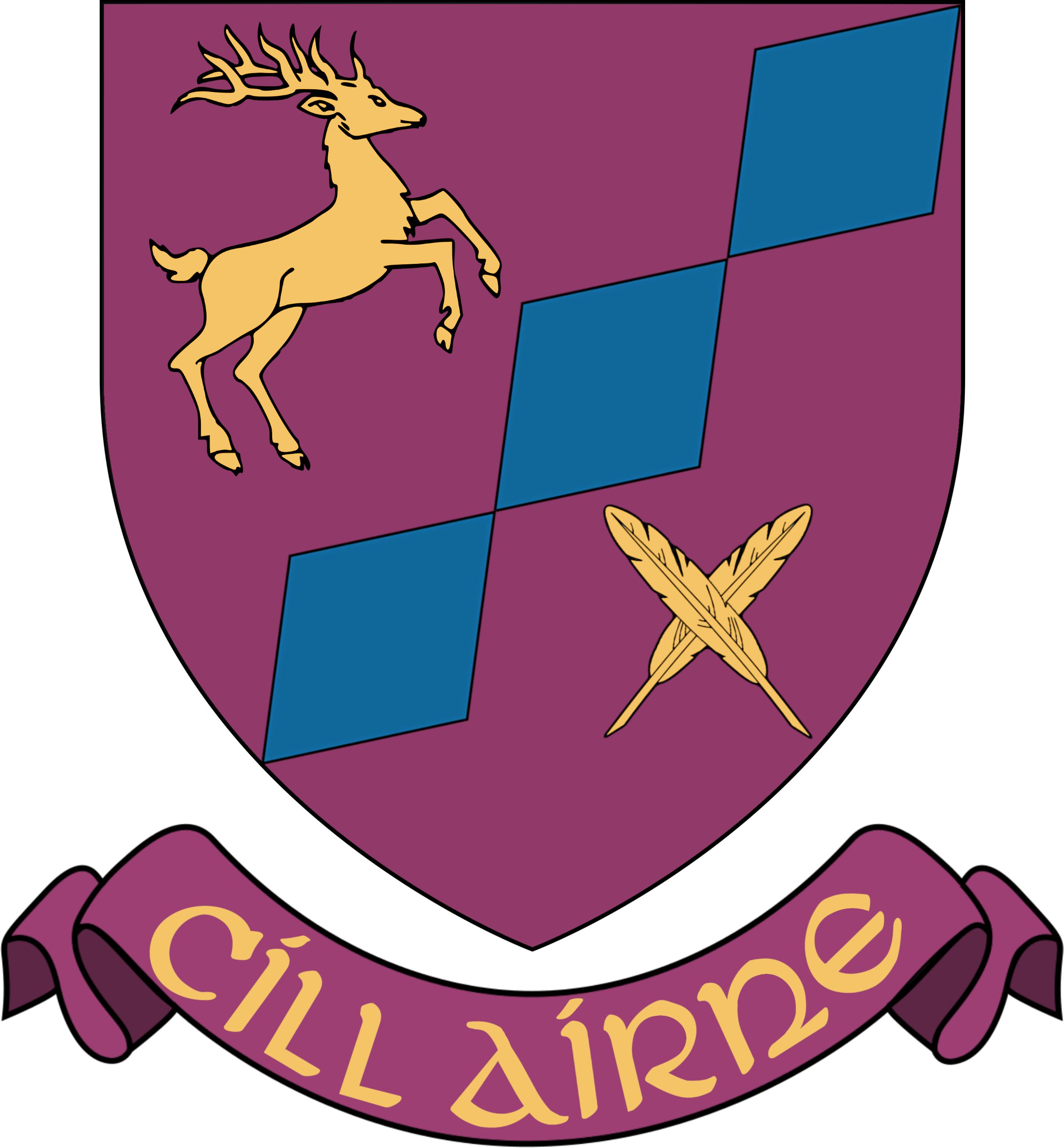
- Coat of arms

- Location in Ireland Killarney (Europe)
- Coordinates: 52.0588°N 9.5072°W
- Country: Ireland
- Province: Munster
- County: County Kerry
- Barony: Magunihy
- Council: Kerry County Council
- Dáil Éireann: Kerry
- European Parliament: South
- Elevation: 50 m (160 ft)

Population (2022)
  - Total: 14,412
- Time zone: UTC±0 (WET)
  - Summer (DST): UTC+1 (IST)
- Eircode routing key: V93
- Telephone area code: +353(0)64
- Irish Grid Reference: V969909
- Website: www.killarney.ie

Killarney (/kɪˈlɑːrni/ kil-AR-nee; Irish: Cill Airne [ˌciːl̠ʲ ˈaːɾˠn̠ʲə], meaning 'church of sloes') is a town in County Kerry, Ireland. It is on the northeastern shore of Lough Leane, part of Killarney National Park, and is home to St Mary's Cathedral, Ross Castle, Muckross House and Abbey, the Lakes of Killarney, MacGillycuddy's Reeks, Purple Mountain, Mangerton Mountain, Paps Mountain, the Gap of Dunloe and Torc Waterfall. Its natural heritage, history and location on the Ring of Kerry make Killarney a popular tourist destination. Tourism has underpinned the town's economy and shaped its development for more than two and a half centuries, and Killarney has been described the birthplace of Irish tourism.

Killarney's population was 14,412 as of the 2022 census, making it the second largest in the county. It won the Best Kept Town award in 2007 in a cross-border competition jointly organised by the Department of the Environment and the Northern Ireland Amenity Council. In 2011, Killarney was named Ireland's tidiest town and the cleanest town in the country by Irish Business Against Litter. It was again named Ireland's tidiest large town in 2023.

== History ==
=== Early history and development ===
Killarney featured prominently in early Irish history, with religious settlements playing an important part of its recorded history. Its first significantly historical settlement was the monastery on nearby Innisfallen Island founded in 640 by St. Finian the Leper, which was occupied for approximately 850 years. It operated until the monks were dispossessed in 1594 by Elizabeth I, Queen of England. According to tradition, the Irish High King Brian Boru received his education at Innisfallen. The island's monastic ruins were later refurbished by the Kenmare estate as a dining place for visitors, part of a broader effort by the town's landlords to open the area up to tourism.

Aghadoe, the local townland which overlooks present day Killarney, may have begun as a pagan religious site. The site has also been associated with the 5th century missionary St. Abban, but 7th century ogham stones mark the first clear evidence of Aghadoe being used as an important site. According to legend, St. Finian founded a monastery at Aghadoe in the 6th or 7th century. The first written record of a monastery dates from 939 AD in the Annals of Innisfallen where the Aghadoe monastery is referred to as the "Old Abbey."

Following the Anglo-Norman invasion of Ireland in 1169, the Normans built Parkavonear Castle, also at Aghadoe. The castle was perhaps intended as an early warning outpost due to its views of the entire Killarney valley and lakes region.

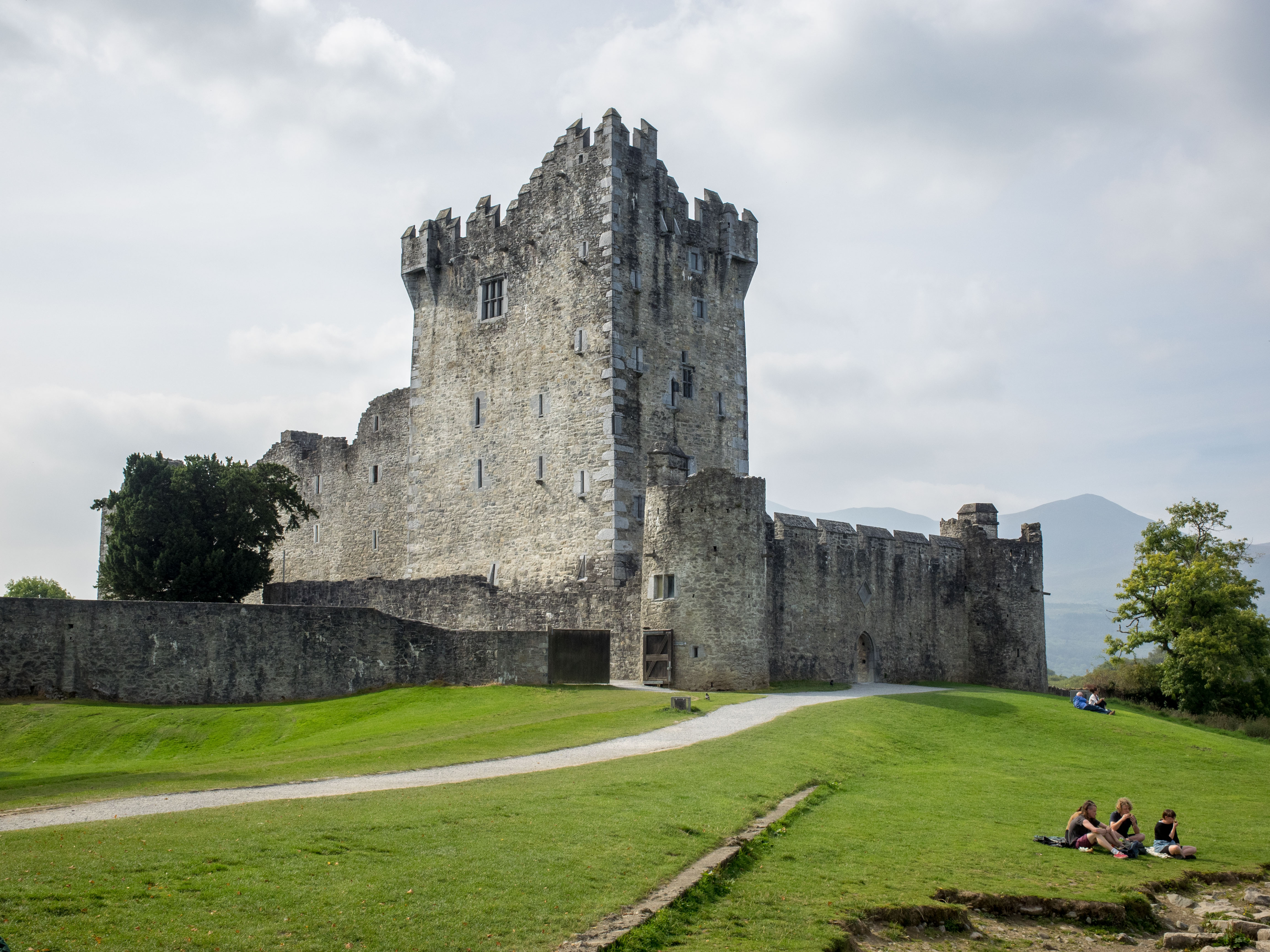
Ross Castle

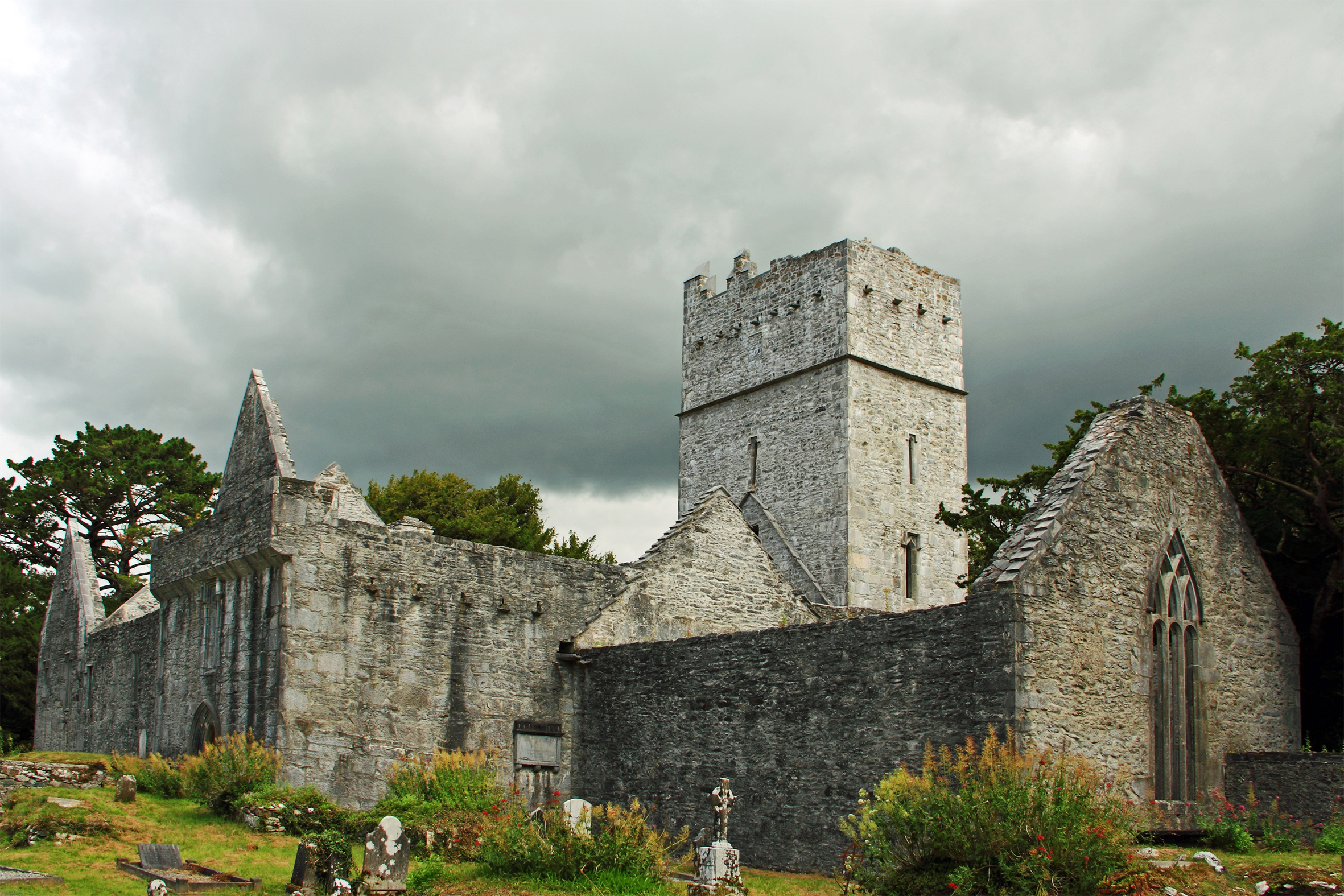
Muckross Abbey

Ross Castle was built on the lake shore in the late 15th century by local ruling clan the O'Donoghues Mor (Ross). Ownership of the castle changed hands during the Desmond Rebellions of the 1580s to the Mac Carty Mor. The castle, since refurbished, remains on the shore of Lough Leane and is open to visitors for a small admission fee.

Muckross Abbey was founded in 1448 as a Franciscan friary for the Observantine Franciscans by Donal McCarthy Mor. The abbey was burned down by Cromwellian forces under General Ludlow in 1654, and today remains a ruin. By the 18th century, the friary's cloister, with its enormous yew tree, had become one of the district's most visited ruins, though the quantity of disinterred human bone left underfoot there drew repeated complaints from travel writers until the Herbert family eventually had the site cleared.

=== 17th and 18th centuries ===
Historical population
Year	Pop.	±%
1821	7,014	—
1831	7,910	+12.8%
1841	7,127	−9.9%
1851	5,901	−17.2%
1861	5,204	−11.8%
1871	5,195	−0.2%
1881	6,651	+28.0%
1891	5,510	−17.2%
1901	5,656	+2.6%
1911	5,796	+2.5%
1926	5,328	−8.1%
1936	5,609	+5.3%
1946	5,947	+6.0%
1951	6,298	+5.9%
1956	6,464	+2.6%
1961	6,825	+5.6%
1966	6,877	+0.8%
1971	7,541	+9.7%
1981	9,083	+20.4%
1986	10,189	+12.2%
1991	9,950	−2.3%
1996	12,011	+20.7%
2002	13,167	+9.6%
2006	14,603	+10.9%
2011	14,219	−2.6%
2016	14,504	+2.0%
2022	14,412	−0.6%

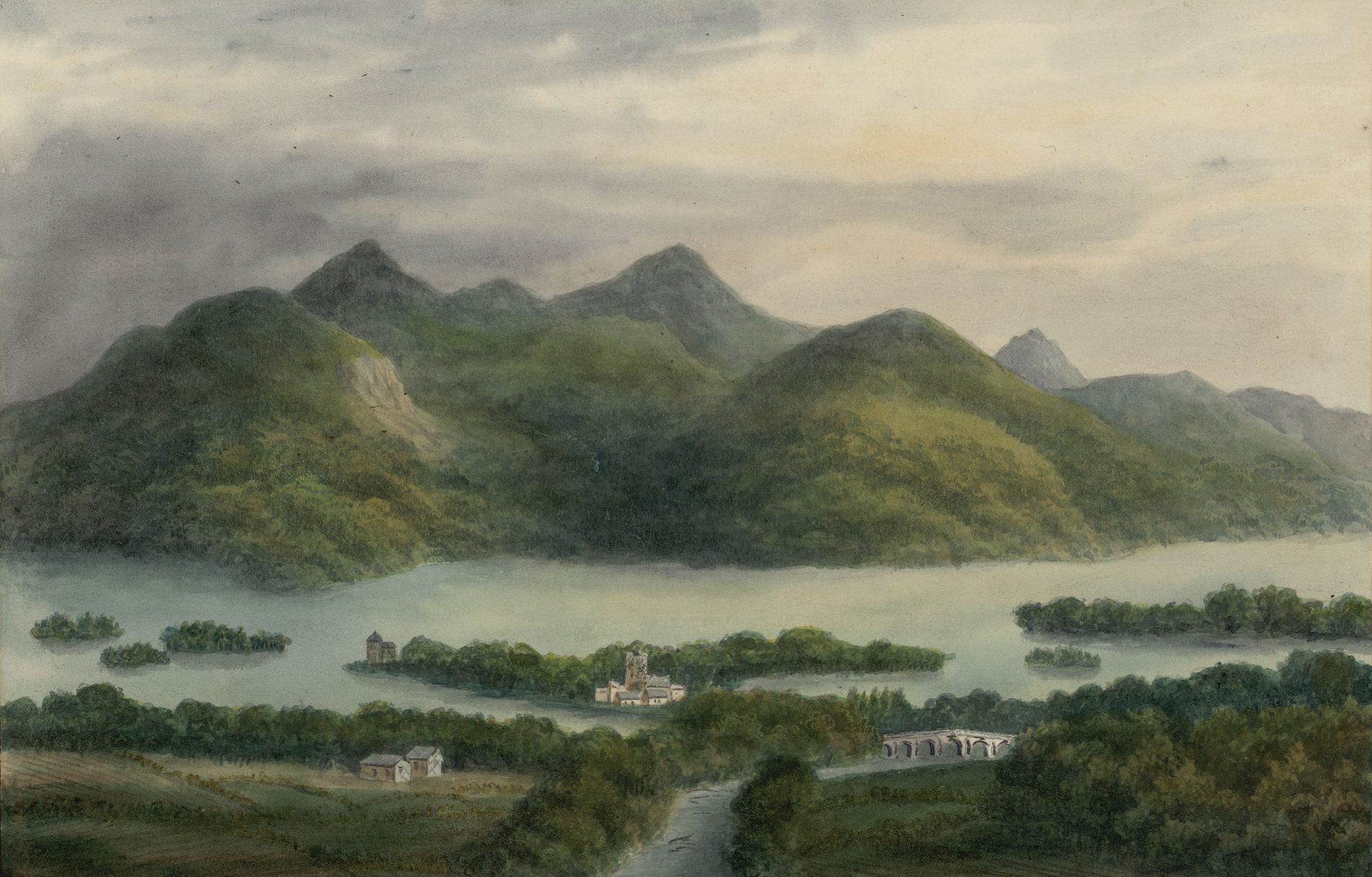
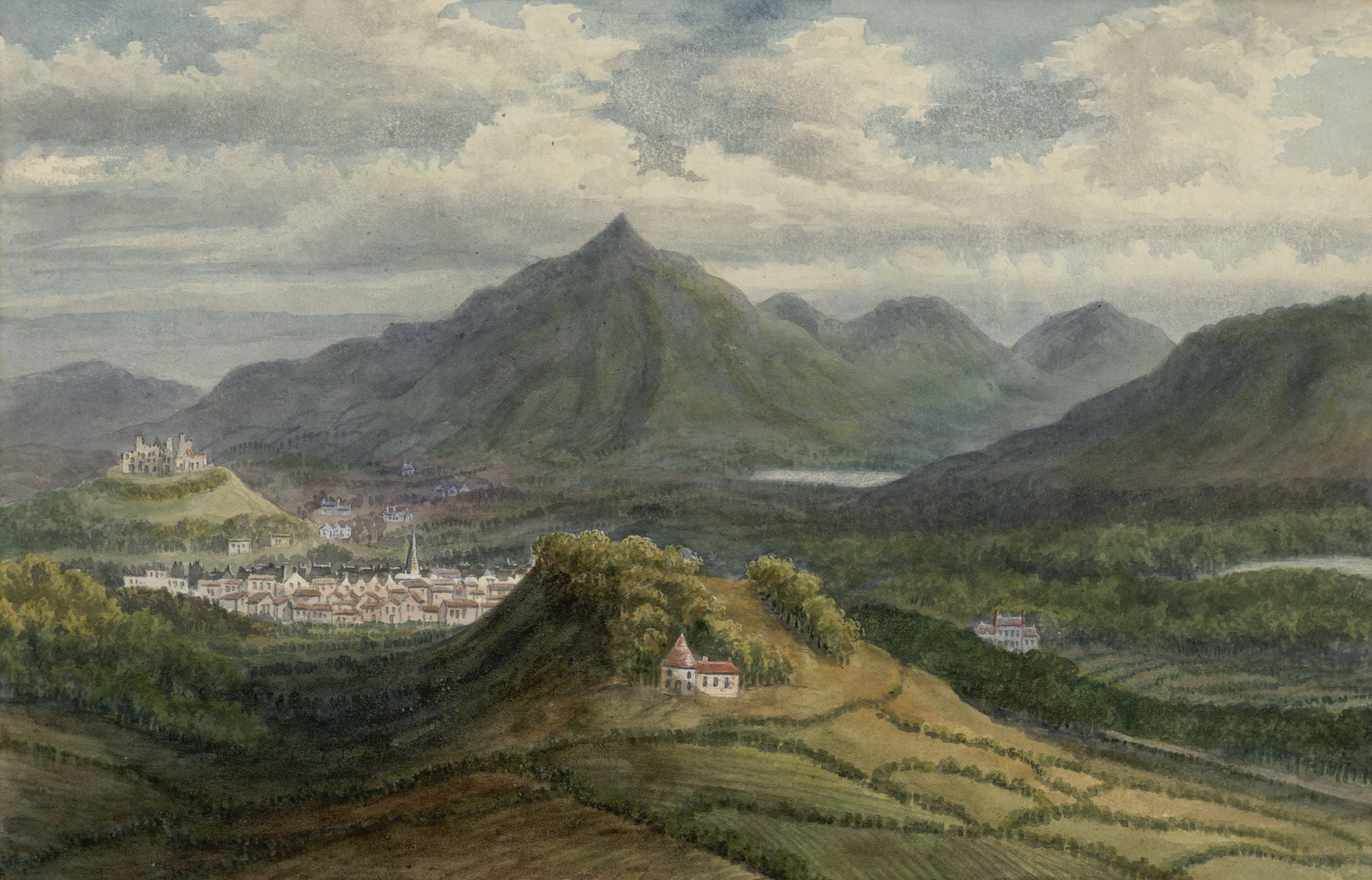
Two views of Killarney painted by a visiting artist in 1830

Killarney's tourism history goes back at least to the mid 18th century, when Thomas, fourth Viscount Kenmare (Lord Kenmare), began to attract visitors and new residents to the town. The date of 1747 was used in recent 250-year celebrations to honour the history of Killarney tourism, though a report previewing those celebrations instead dated the town's beginnings as a tourist resort to 1754, the year Kenmare came into his inheritance. On travelling to the estate he had inherited, Kenmare found boggy, barren land and considerable debt, but recognised the tourism potential of the lakes' islands and of Muckross Abbey and Ross Castle, and set about planting trees, draining bogs, mending roads and encouraging the building of inns.

Killarney's lakes and mountains had already begun to attract the attention of travellers drawn to landscapes associated with the sublime, a taste that would later be applied to England's Lake District. Writing in 1735, Lord Orrery described the lake to a friend as a "Beauty of Nature", noting its many small islands and the echoes produced when hounds pursued deer through the surrounding hills. The historian Luke Gibbons has characterised the opening up of Killarney to visitors after the 1740s as one of the founding moments of European Romanticism, while the traveller John Bush, writing in 1764, described the lake's mountains using the sublime vocabulary of the period, calling them "horrible and frightful precipices". By 1777, the topographer Thomas Campbell felt able to omit Killarney from his own survey of southern Ireland on the grounds that the lakes had already been described so often by other writers.

Killarney's landlords, chiefly the Brownes of Kenmare and, from the 1770s, the Herbert family of Muckross, organised much of the visitor experience on their estates. Kenmare controlled the boats used to tour the lakes, restricted them to oars rather than sails because of sudden mountain squalls, and set fixed hire charges through the town's hotels. Visitors frequently complained about the cost of hiring boatmen, buglers and cannon fire to produce the echoes for which the lakes became famous, a spectacle enjoyed by travellers including the poet Alfred, Lord Tennyson, who visited Ross Castle in 1848 and was inspired to write the poem later appended to The Princess: A Medley. An artificial deer hunt, in which a stag was driven from the mountains into the lake and captured by boatmen before being released, was staged for visitors on the Kenmare estate and has been described by later commentators as an early Irish example of a staged tourist spectacle. Local guides, boatmen and vendors, some of the poorest members of Killarney's pre-Famine population, relied heavily on income from visitors, and Kate Kearney's Cottage, built at the mouth of the Gap of Dunloe around 1807 and named after a popular parlour song, remains a visitor stop to the present day.

Muckross House was built in the 1840s by the Herbert family, who were connected to Queen Victoria by marriage and spent over a decade trying to persuade her to visit, in the course of which they nearly bankrupted themselves improving the house and gardens. The house was sold on twice before its final private owners, the barrister Arthur Rose Vincent and his parents-in-law, presented the 11,000-acre estate to the Irish state in 1932 as the Bourn Vincent Memorial Park, forming the country's first national park, later expanded by further donations including Killarney House.

Killarney was granted town commissioners under the Towns Improvement (Ireland) Act 1854, which was converted to an urban district under the Local Government (Ireland) Act 1898, and a town council under the Local Government Act 2001.

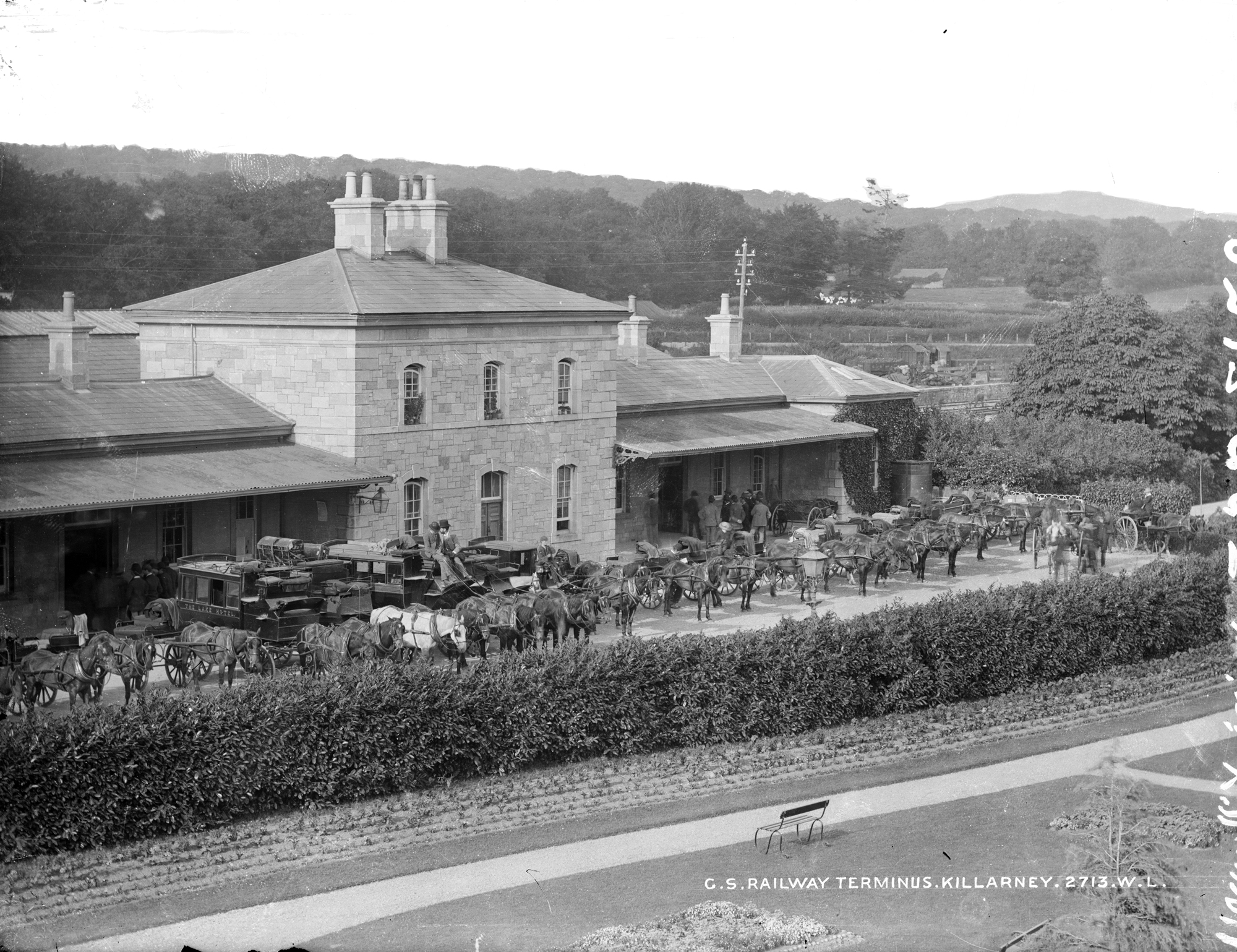
Great Southern Railway Terminus in Killarney, circa late 1800s

Killarney benefited greatly from the coming of the railway in July 1853. British trade directory publisher Isaac Slater noted that there were three hotels in the town in 1846 but by 1854, one year after the coming of the railway, James Fraser named seven hotels and described their locations:

the Railway Hotel opposite the Railway Station; the Kenmare Arms and Hibernia which are on the main street and immediately opposite the church... the Victoria which is about a mile [1.5 km] to the west of the town on the shores of the Lower Lake; the Lake View which is about the same distance to the east of the town and also on the shore of the Lower Lake; the Muckross about two and a half miles [4 km] away and near the Muckross Lake and the Torc which occupies an elevated site about a mile and a half [2.5 km] from the town on the hill which rises immediately over the Lake Hotel.

An 1852 guidebook, the Irish Tourist's Illustrated Handbook for Visitors to Ireland, devoted several pages to Killarney and to the prices then charged by the town's hotels, reflecting the district's status as one of Ireland's best known destinations by the mid 19th century, alongside places such as the Giant's Causeway and Bray.

In 1858, Irish-born Victorian journalist, Samuel Carter Hall named O'Sullivan's Hotel and the Innisfallen rather than the Hibernia and Torc, but Isaac Slater also named the Hibernia in 1846. At the time he was writing, tours of the Ring of Kerry were already an industry and Killarney was considered the starting point of the 175-kilometre (110 mi) circuitous route. He was fascinated by the horses' endurance on the two-day trip, and leaves clear advice for other travellers;

It is a common and wise custom of those who make this tour, and are not pressed for time, to hire the carriage at the hotel in Killarney and continue with it 'all the way round.' It is absolutely marvellous what these mountain bred horses can get through "thinking nothing" of thirty miles [50 km] for days together or even fifty miles [80 km] in a single day.

As part of the trip, he noted that there were hotels in Glenbeigh and Waterville along with a "comfortable inn", which is now the Butler Arms Hotel.

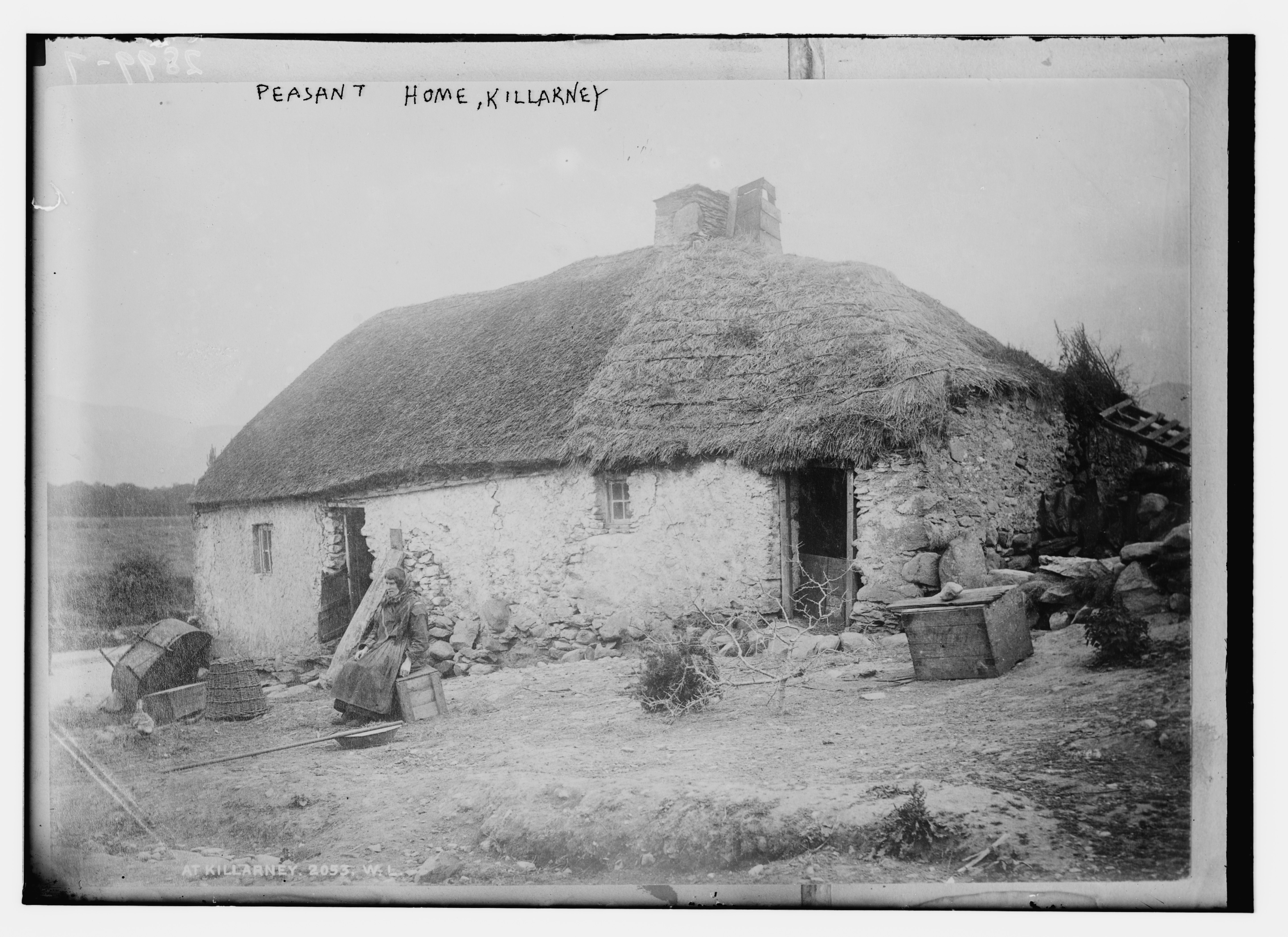
Peasant home, Killarney, circa late 1800s

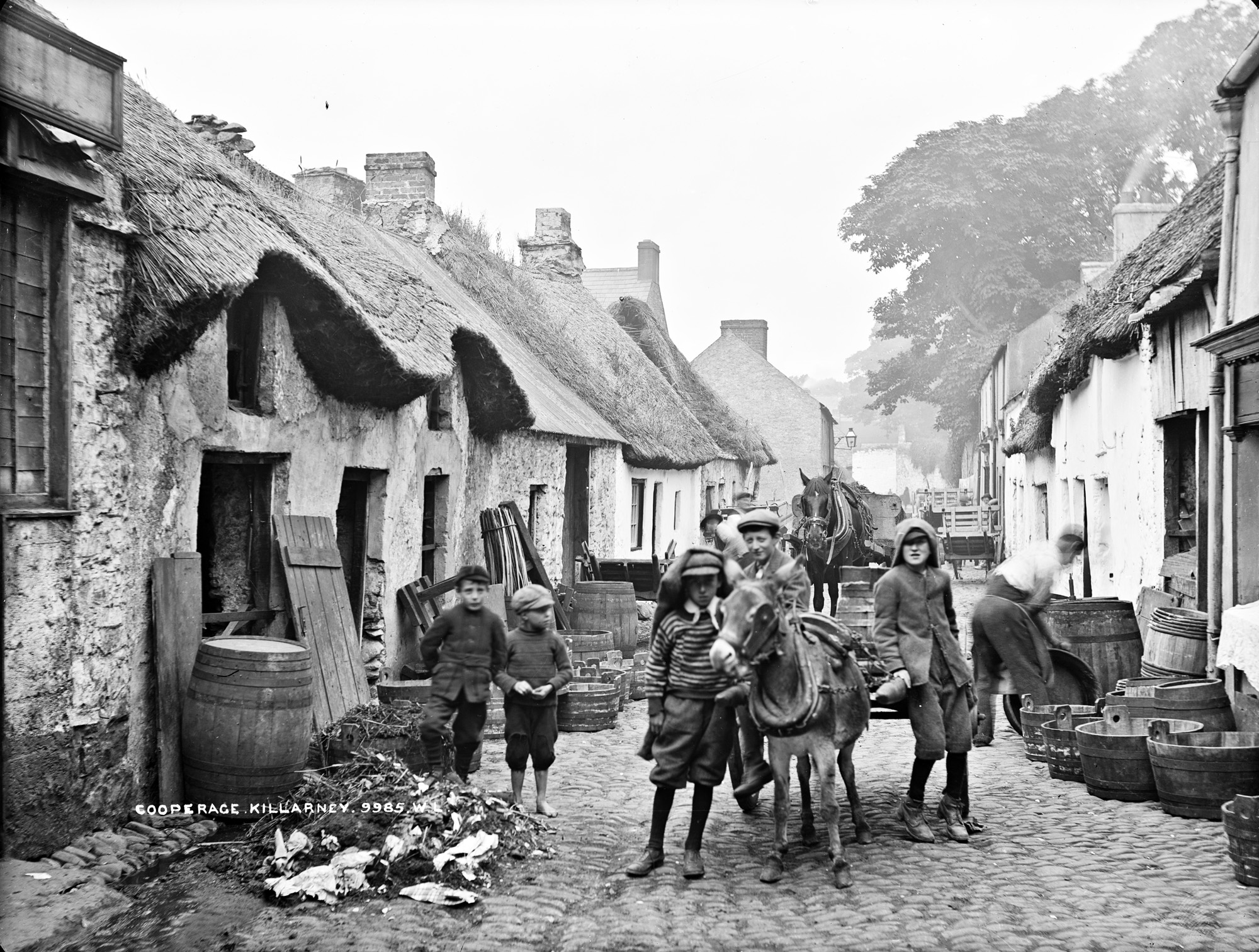
A cooperage in the streets of Killarney, circa late 1800s

A visit by Queen Victoria in 1861 gave the town some international exposure. The visit followed the West End success of Dion Boucicault's play The Colleen Bawn, which opened at London's Adelphi Theatre in September 1860 and relocated the story of the Colleen Bawn murder, a real killing that had taken place near Limerick in 1819, to the Lakes of Killarney. The queen was said to have seen the play three times and commissioned a series of paintings of its scenes, and her wish to see the landscape she had encountered on stage is thought to have contributed to her decision to visit Killarney later that year rather than the cities she had previously toured. The play's popularity led local boatmen to identify a 'Devil's Island' and a 'Colleen Bawn Rock' on Muckross Lake to satisfy visitors seeking the sites associated with the drama, even though the specific locations described in the play were fictional.

=== 20th century ===
Killarney was heavily involved in the Irish War of Independence. The town, and indeed the entire county, had strong republican ties, and skirmishes with British forces happened on a regular basis. The Great Southern Hotel was for a time taken over by the British, both as an office and barracks, and to protect the neighbouring railway station. The most notable engagement of the war in the district was the Headford Ambush of 21 March 1921, in which upwards of 30 members of the IRA's Kerry No. 2 Brigade Flying Column, led by Dan Allman, attacked a train carrying soldiers of the 1st Battalion Royal Fusiliers as it changed at Headford Junction a few kilometres from the town. The fifty-minute engagement, considered one of the largest and most successful actions fought by the IRA against regular British forces during the war, left two IRA volunteers, Allman and Jimmy Bailey, and nine Fusiliers dead, along with three civilian cattle dealers who were caught in the crossfire. News of the ambush was raised in the British parliament and raised the profile of the Kerry IRA nationally, setting the scene for further violence in the county.

Following the Anglo-Irish Treaty, divisions among former republican colleagues developed quickly, and Kerry, including Killarney, became one of the most violent theatres of the Irish Civil War. Killarney was captured by pro-Treaty National Army forces within days of their seaborne landing at Fenit in early August 1922, after which the anti-Treaty IRA retreated into the surrounding hills and mountains to wage a guerrilla campaign. The town's Great Southern Hotel served as a National Army base during this period, and it was on its steps that a 17-year-old prisoner, Bertie Murphy, was shot dead in September 1922 in reprisal for an IRA ambush, one of a series of killings of prisoners carried out by pro-Treaty troops, chiefly drawn from the Dublin Guard and First Western Division, in the autumn of 1922. That same month, two unarmed National Army medical orderlies, aged 18 and 20, were shot dead by IRA members while on a boating excursion on Innisfallen Island, a killing that was widely condemned at the time.

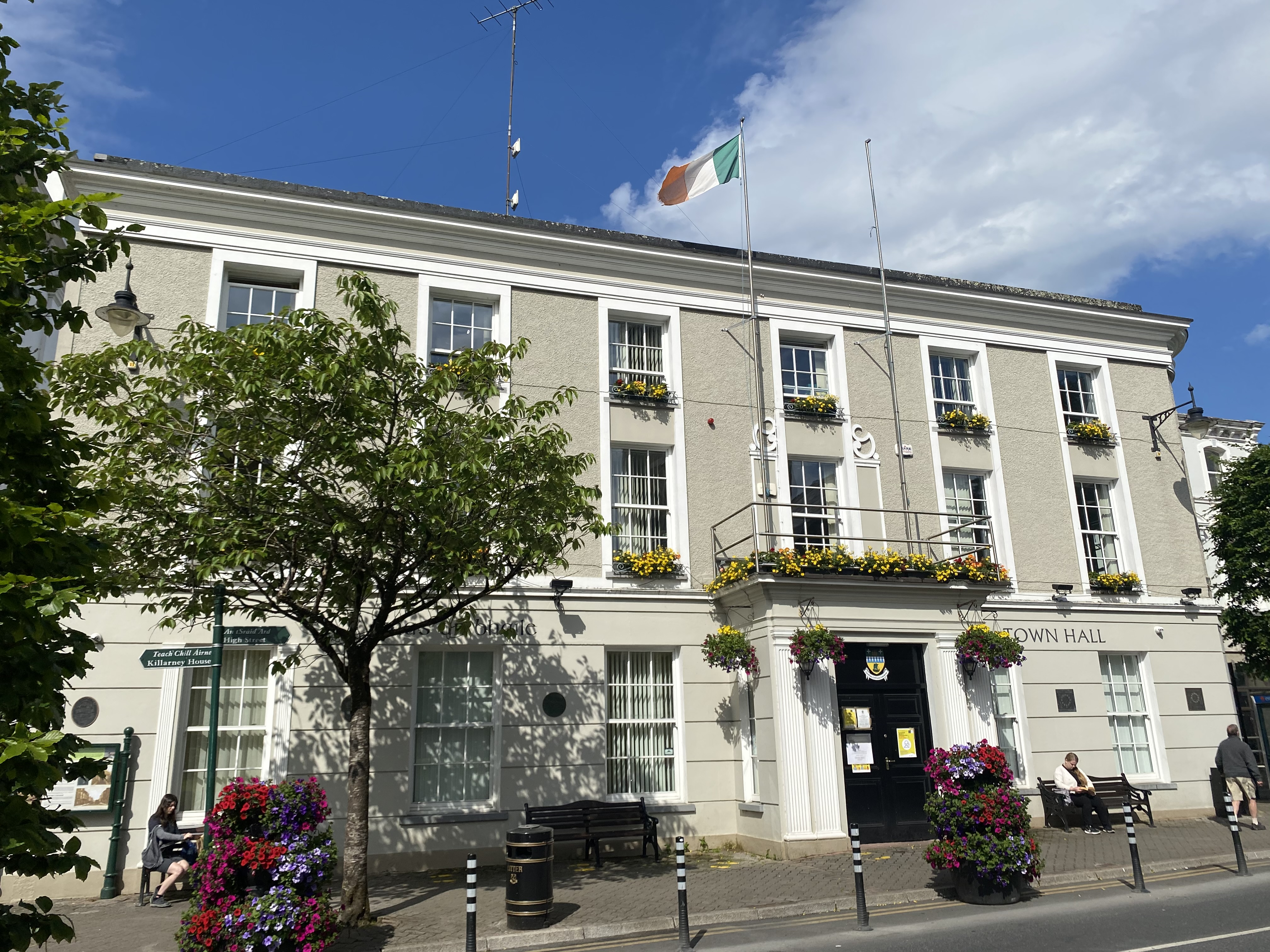
Killarney Town Hall

Killarney Town Hall was erected in Kenmare Place in around 1930.

In 1965, residents on Henn Street voted on a proposal to rename Killarney's streets from their English names to Irish ones in honour of Irish patriots. The vote was tied, with the proposal defeated as a result, and locals cited both the cost of the change and a wish to preserve the town's existing street names as part of its history.

Killarney's tourism infrastructure was further developed in the years following the recession of the 1930s with the establishment of Killarney Golf & Fishing Club, Fitzgerald Stadium and Killarney Racecourse. In 1955, the Killarney Tourist Development Company Ltd. was formed by local business and civic interests to promote and develop tourism, and a successor body, the Killarney Tourist Industry Co-ordinating Committee, ran the National Food & Wine Catering Exhibition on four occasions between 1961 and 1969 and lobbied successfully for Muckross House and Estate, which had lain unused since being presented to the state in 1933, to be developed as a museum and visitor attraction.

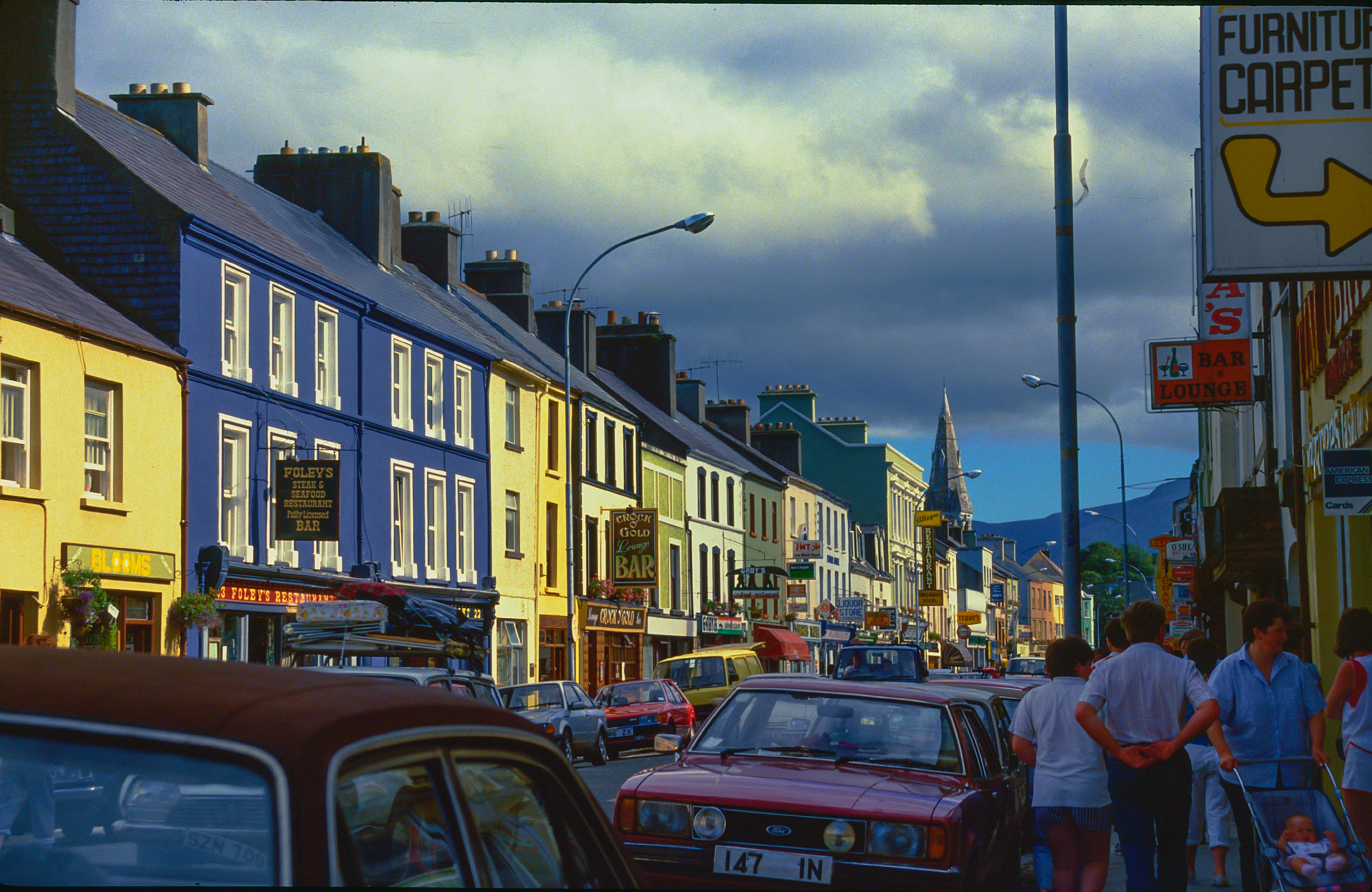
Killarney in 1987

=== 21st century ===
By the early 2000s, tourism industry figures had begun to express concern that Killarney was losing market share to Dublin and to competing destinations, prompting the "Killarney 250" celebrations of 2004 and 2005 to mark the town's origins as a resort. The then chief executive of Killarney Chamber of Commerce and Tourism, Jerry O'Grady, said the town was "considered beautiful, but light" by comparison with destinations offering greater depth of heritage, and warned that visitors who returned repeatedly to sites such as Newgrange did not necessarily do the same for Killarney. The same period saw criticism of environmental neglect in the surrounding national park, including pollution in Lough Leane and the deterioration of the 19th-century Dinis Cottage, and of the town's ineligibility for UNESCO World Heritage status due to a lack of buffer zones around its lakeshore developments.

Between 2008 and 2011, Dublin Institute of Technology carried out the DIT-ACHIEV Sustainable Tourism project in Killarney, jointly funded by the Environmental Protection Agency and Fáilte Ireland, assessing the town's traffic, habitat and water quality, and the attitudes of residents and businesses towards tourism. A resident survey carried out as part of the project found that fewer than one per cent of respondents held a negative view of visitors, and that 87 per cent believed the town was well able to cope with visitor numbers, notwithstanding complaints about traffic and parking during peak season. A separate 2010 survey by DIT found that nine out of every ten businesses in the town were directly or indirectly dependent on tourism.

In 2014, the Local Government Reform Act 2014 dissolved the town council with the creation of Killarney Municipal District under the authority of Kerry County Council.

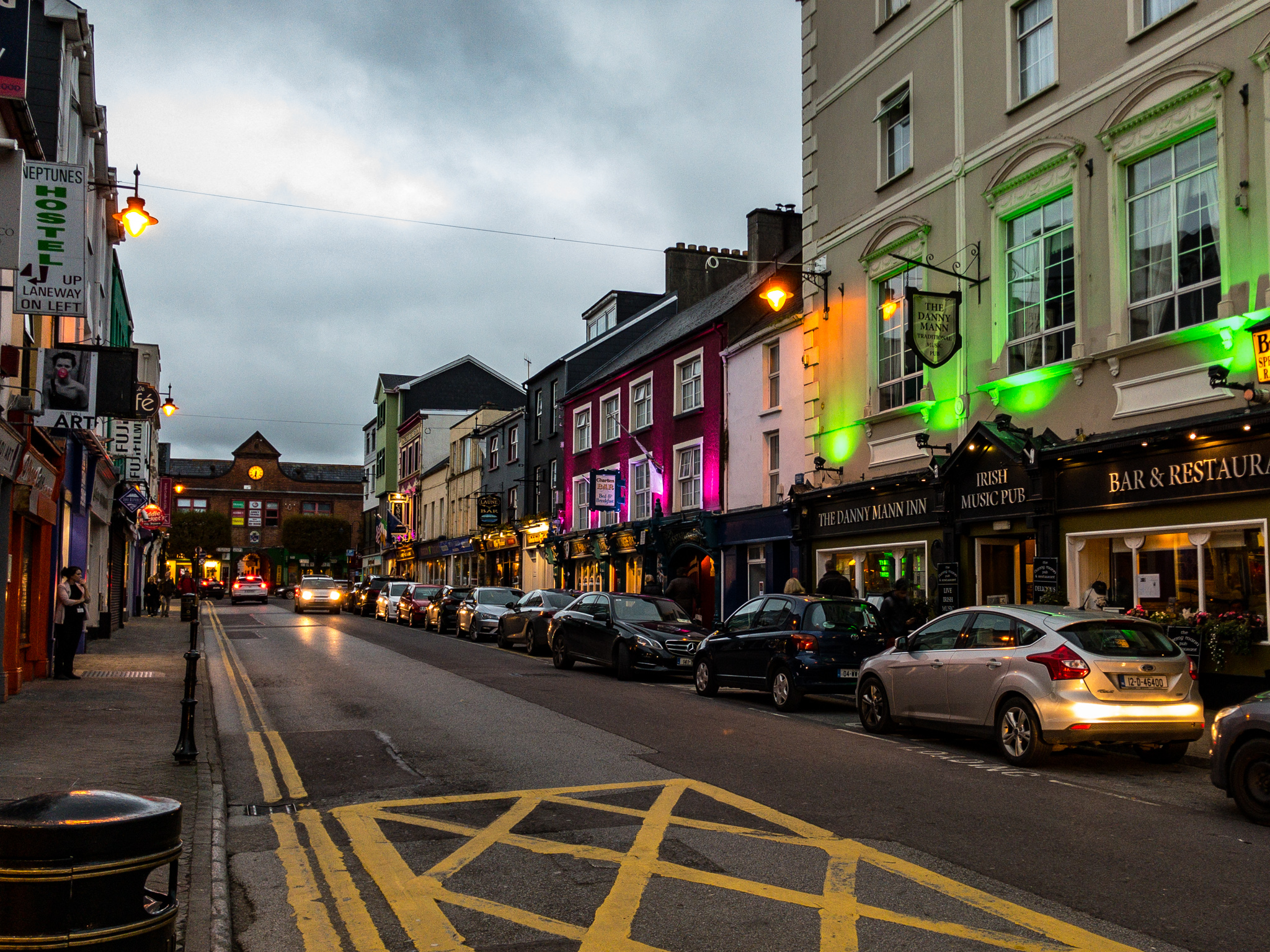
Killarney in 2018

By the late 2010s, growth in visitor numbers had brought renewed pressure on the town's infrastructure. A 2018 industry report warned that projected growth from 1.1 million visitors in 2017 to a forecast 1.4 million by 2025 would strain roads and parking further, and hoteliers and the Killarney Chamber of Commerce repeatedly called on Kerry County Council to address chronic summer traffic congestion on the approach roads to the town. The COVID-19 pandemic brought a sharp reversal, with hotel occupancy in the town falling to around a third of capacity in the summer of 2020 and family jaunting car and boat operators reporting takings as low as five to ten per cent of a typical season.

From 2022, the accommodation of Ukrainian refugees and international protection applicants in Killarney's hotels, guesthouses and hostels became a source of local debate, as the town, with a resident population of just over 14,000, was reported to be housing more than 3,000 people under state contracts by late 2022. The Killarney Asylum Seekers Initiative, a support organisation in operation since the early 2000s, said the scale of arrivals had left local health, education and welcome services at "breaking point". By mid-2023, businesses in the town were reporting a marked fall in trade attributed to the loss of tourist beds, and Kerry County Council officials told a council meeting that no emergency accommodation remained available in Killarney even for local families facing eviction.

In February 2026, the government reversed a planned restriction on short-term holiday lettings in towns with populations over 10,000, raising the threshold to 20,000 following lobbying from the tourism industry and from Kerry TD Michael Healy-Rae, meaning Killarney's roughly 300 Airbnb-style lettings would remain unaffected by the new rules, in contrast to just two properties listed for long-term rent in the town at the time. Critics of the change argued it favoured the tourism sector over efforts to increase housing supply, while supporters said short-term lets remained essential to towns without sufficient hotel capacity to meet demand.

== Economy ==
=== Industry ===
Thomas Browne, 4th Viscount Kenmare founded linen mills in the 1740s as part of his efforts to increase the population and economy of Killarney. In later years, hosiery and shoemaking were major industries in the town. One such shoe factory was Hillards, which employed 250 people at its peak.

Modern businesses include Tricel (also known as Killarney Plastics), which was founded in 1973. The Killarney operation was established by Con and Anne Stack, who began manufacturing fibreglass and glass-reinforced products, including water tanks made to replace rust-prone galvanised steel models for the town's then-thriving Pretty Polly factory, working from a shed at their home before moving to a purpose-built industrial unit and later to the company's current premises at Ballyspillane. By late 2025, the wider Tricel group employed around 620 people across 14 companies, of whom 200 were based in Killarney.

In the public sector, both the Department of Culture, Communications and Sport and Department of Justice, Home Affairs and Migration have offices in Killarney.

==== Liebherr ====
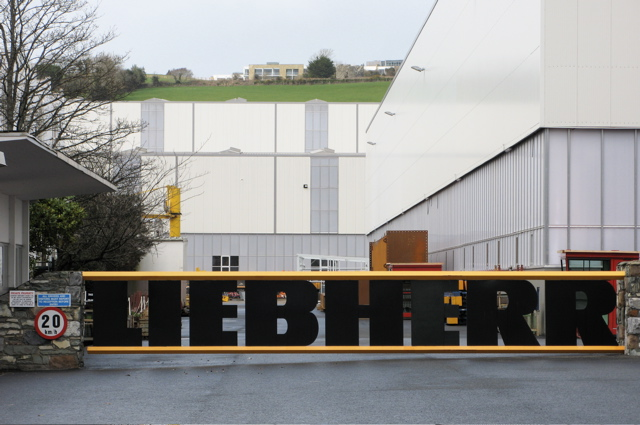
The Liebherr factory in Killarney

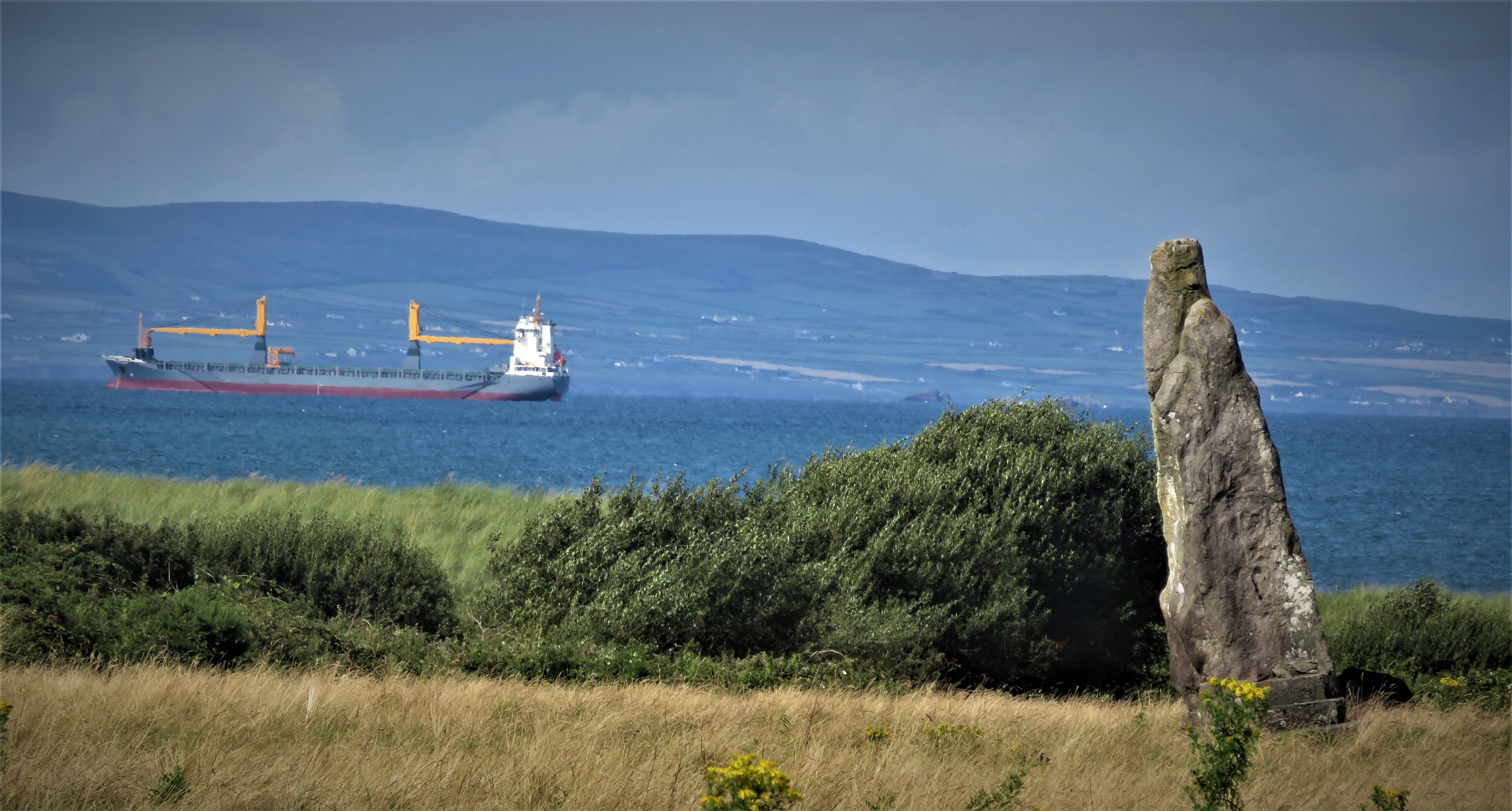
Standing stone at Aughacasla, Castlegregory, with a Liebherr ship passing in the background from Fenit harbour

In early 1958, a delegation of Killarney business people learned that the German industrialist Hans Liebherr, who was considering a site at Mallow, County Cork, for a new factory, was staying at the town's Great Southern Hotel, and arranged to meet him for dinner before bringing him the following morning to view the lakes from Aghadoe. Liebherr, whose crane company had been founded in Germany in 1949, decided within days to locate his first overseas subsidiary at Gortroe on the edge of the town rather than in Mallow. Liebherr (Ireland) Ltd was registered on 11 April 1958, with site work beginning on the factory on St Patrick's Day that year. The land Liebherr had originally intended for the factory was considered too scenic for industrial use and was instead developed as the Hotel Europe, with the plant itself built on a 60-acre farm nearby.

The Killarney plant, which initially produced tower cranes before moving into the ship-to-shore container cranes, grew into one of the town's principal employers alongside tourism, and a road on the town's northern relief route was named Hans Liebherr Road in his honour. Workforce numbers fluctuated considerably over the following decades, falling to a low of 247 in the mid-1990s before recovering during a period industry observers described as a "golden age". By 2012, the factory employed 607 people and was supplying container cranes to 75 ports in 44 countries, and had received planning permission for a €30 million, 16,500 square metre expansion. That year, Killarney Chamber of Commerce and Tourism lobbied University College Cork to award an honorary doctorate to Isolde Liebherr, who ran the group with her brother Willi following their father's death in 1993; the town council separately granted her the freedom of Killarney.

In March 2012, Liebherr purchased the Lackabane course from Killarney Golf and Fishing Club, which surrounds the factory on three sides, for approximately €6 million, in a deal that allowed the club to clear its debts while giving the company land for future expansion. The following year, the company said it was "re-evaluating" its dependency on the Killarney plant after a Labour Court recommendation directed it to pay 2.5 per cent in backpay following industrial action, warning that the ruling put planned expansion in jeopardy, prompting local politicians to lobby the German ambassador and government ministers. In 2018, amid a global downturn in orders from container terminal operators and increased competition from Chinese manufacturers, the plant's roughly 900 employees were given notice of a temporary three-day week, and around 27 long-term contract staff lost their positions.

In August 2022, three ship-to-shore cranes manufactured in Killarney were shipped from Cork Harbour to the Port of New York and New Jersey, described by the transport company handling the operation as the largest single objects ever engineered in Ireland. At the time, the Killarney plant employed 790 people, and the group's maritime crane division recorded turnover of €740 million for the previous year. A company history, The Liebherr Story, written by former Works Organisation Manager Tom Foley, was published in 2023, recounting the persuasion of Hans Liebherr to locate in a town "remote from port facilities" and with "little industrial experience". By May 2026, the Killarney operation employed 931 people, and its 2025 financial statement recorded revenue of €379.6 million, up from €333.7 million the previous year, attributed to new order intakes and increased production.

=== Tourism ===
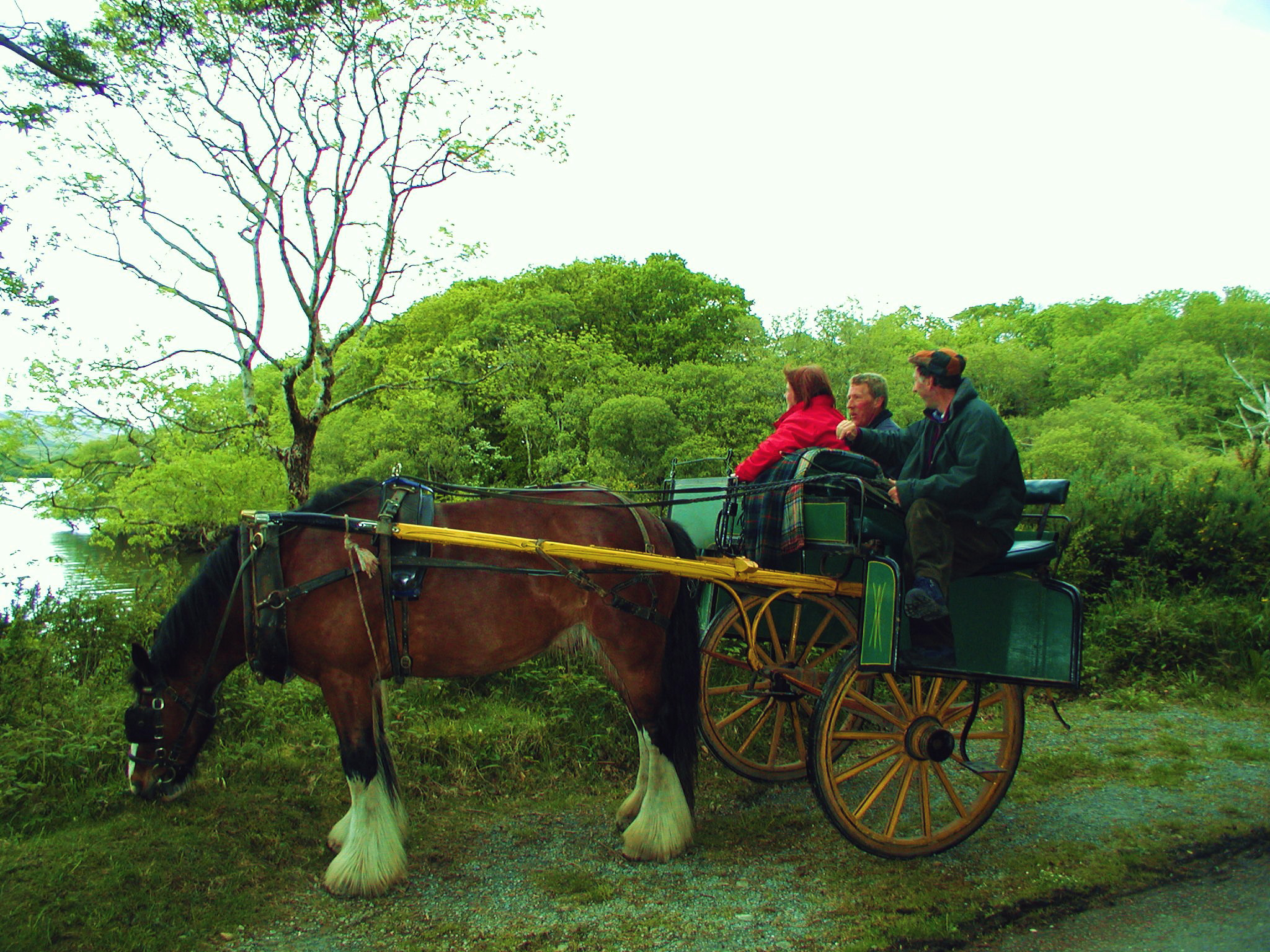
Tourists near Ross Castle

Tourism is the largest industry in Killarney, generating around €410 million every year. Roughly 1.1 million tourists visit the town every year, with foreign tourists making up over 60% of all visitors.

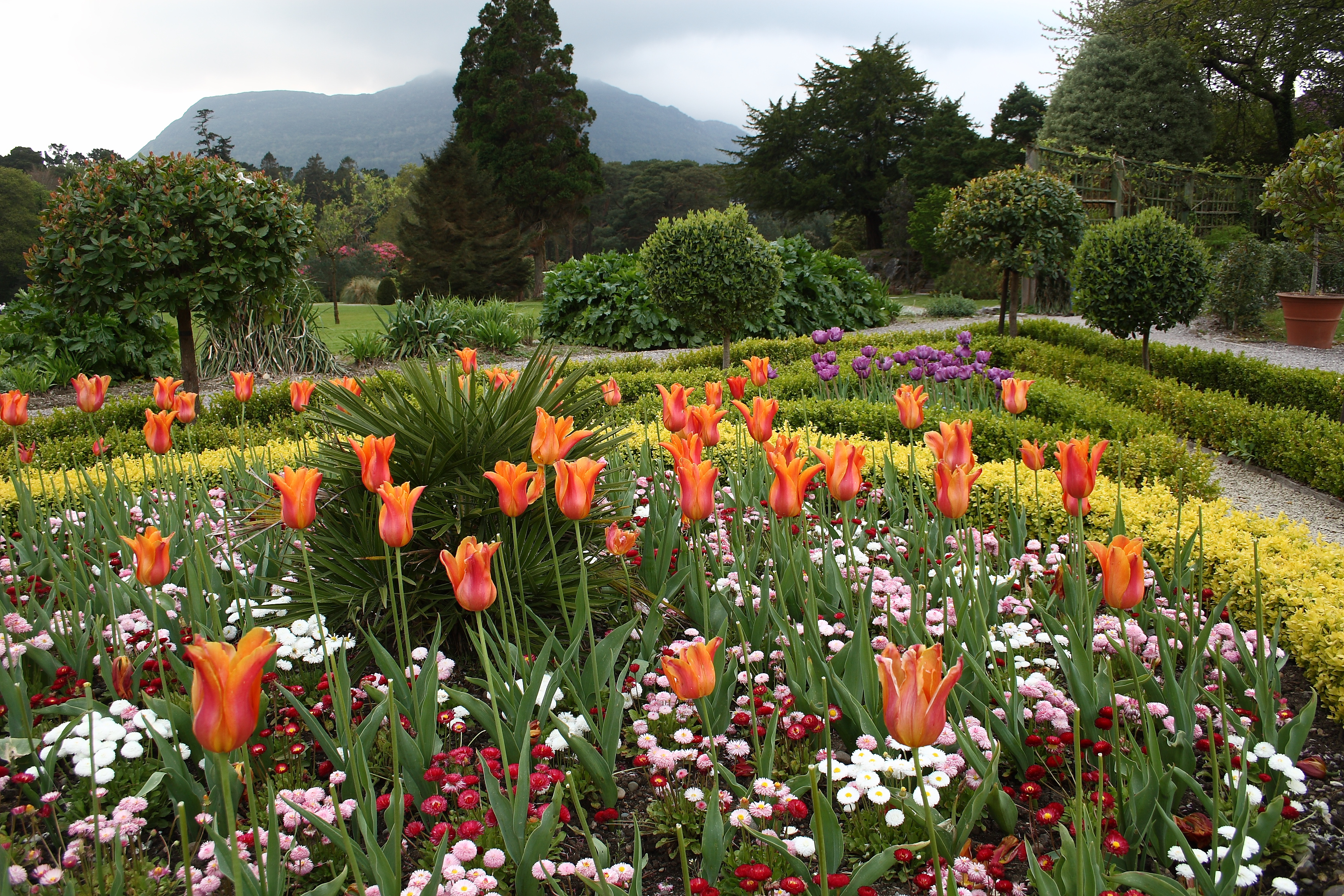
Flower Garden at Muckross House

Outside of Dublin, Killarney has more hotel and guesthouse beds than any other town or city in the state, with an estimated 10,600 tourist beds generating close to 1.6 million bed nights annually.

Killarney's jaunting cars, horse-drawn carriages operated by local families known as jarveys, remain one of the town's most recognisable tourist features, with around 70 licensed cars operating from the town and Killarney National Park in a normal season, the majority owned and driven by individual operators.

In 2023, in a scheme intended to reduce litter volumes during the tourist season, Killarney became the first town in Ireland to ban single-use coffee cups.

== Transport ==
=== Road ===
Killarney is served by National Primary Route N22 (north to Tralee and Castleisland and east to Cork); the National Secondary Routes N72 (west to Killorglin and east to Mallow, Fermoy, and Dungarvan) and the N71 (south to Kenmare and Bantry).

=== Rail ===
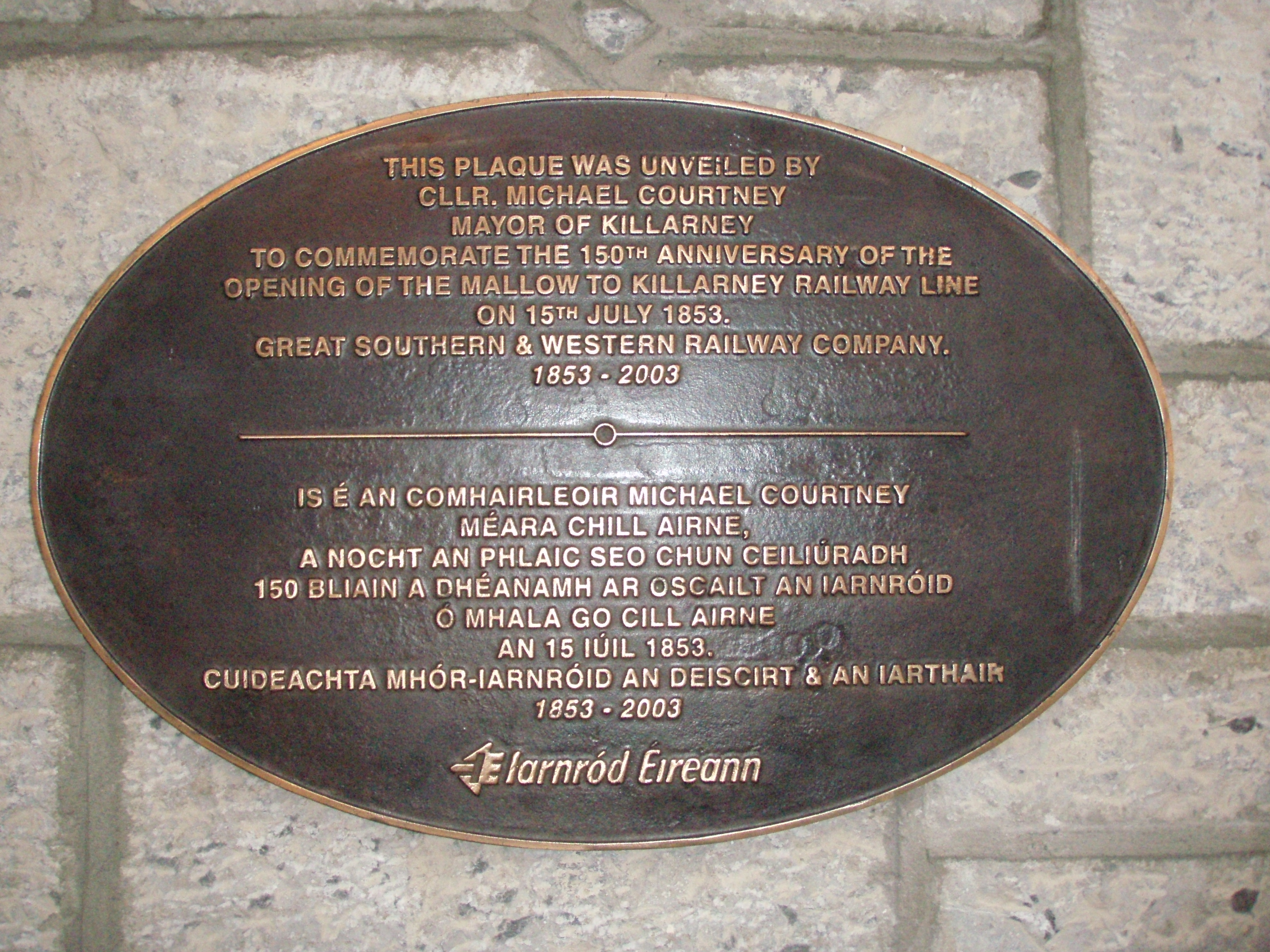
Plaque commemorating the coming of the Railway to Killarney

Killarney railway station (operated by Iarnród Éireann) has direct services to Tralee, Cork and Dublin, with connections to the rest of the rail network.

=== Bus ===
Bus Éireann provides bus services to Limerick (and onwards to Galway), Tralee, Cork, Kenmare and Skibbereen.

As part of a one-year trial period taking place in other places across the country, TFI Local Link in Kerry, in co-operation with Transport for Ireland, launched the "TFI Anseo" app in Killarney during August 2025. Within four months, it had moved 20,000 people within the town using a "demand-responsive transport" service.

=== Air ===
Kerry Airport (17 km), in Farranfore between Tralee and Killarney, provides a number of air services with connecting trains running from Farranfore railway station to Killarney railway station. Cork Airport (89 km), easily accessible by bus or rail, also serves the Kerry region.

== Sport ==
=== Association football ===
The International Football Association Board (IFAB), the body that determines the Laws of the Game, met at the Lake Hotel in Killarney in 1905.

Killarney has three football clubs—all of which compete in the Kerry District League.

Killarney Athletic A.F.C. was founded in 1965, and played its first competitive game in the Desmond League as a youth team. It entered a junior team at the start of 1966. In the early 1970s, the club became a founding club of the Kerry District League (KDL). Originally the club played in the centre of Killarney, but have since moved to a modern facility (with two pitches) in the Woodlawn area of the town.

Killarney Celtic F.C. was founded in 1976. The club purchased their own ground in 1993 and have invested in their facilities since then. There is a grass pitch and a FIFA 1-star full-size synthetic all-weather pitch (both floodlit to match standard), a 50 x 80 metre grass training pitch and a 70 x 35 metre synthetic training pitch which is also fully floodlit.

Cedar Galaxy was formed in 2011 and play in the Kerry District League Division 2B. The team were promoted to Division 2A for the 2013/2014 campaign.

=== Gaelic games ===
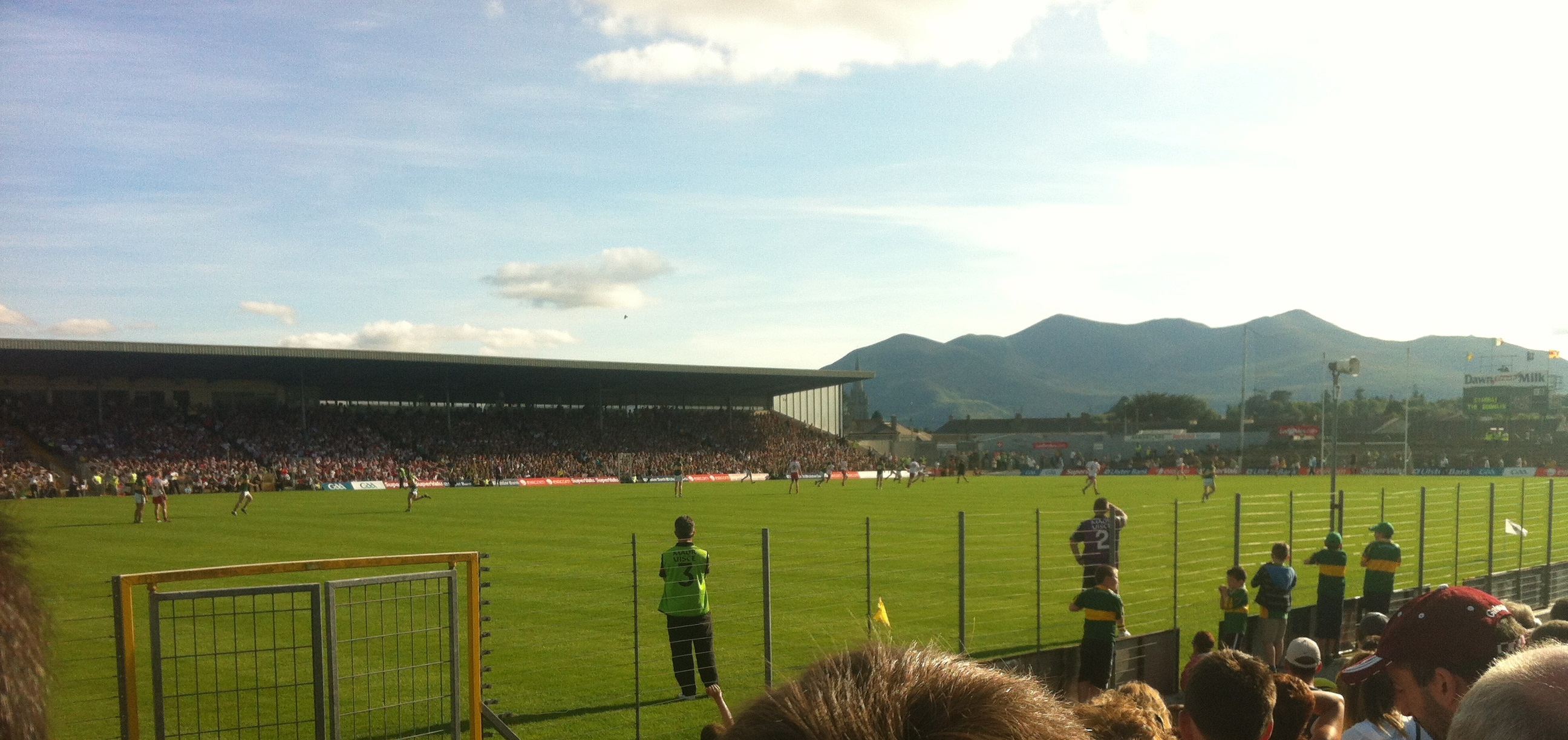
Fitzgerald Stadium

The Kerry GAA branch of the Gaelic Athletic Association was founded in 1888. Kerry's county hurling and county football teams play at the Fitzgerald Stadium in Killarney, which opened in 1936 and has capacity for 43,180 spectators.

Killarney has three Gaelic football clubs: Dr Crokes, Killarney Legion and Spa. The rural hinterland also has a number of football teams, including Kilcummin, Fossa, Firies, Glenflesk and Gneeveguilla. All these teams compete in the Kerry County league and the East Kerry Senior Football Championship (O'Donoghue Cup) and league.

Dr. Crokes is the most successful of these teams, winning the All-Ireland Senior Club Football Championship in 1992 and the Munster Senior Club Football Championship in 1991, 1990 and 2007. The club has also won the County Championship on 7 separate occasions, including in 2010. Dr. Crokes is the only club in Killarney with a hurling team; it won the Kerry Intermediate Hurling Championship in 1999 and 2001.

=== Rowing ===
There are six rowing clubs in the town, who share a common history in Ireland's oldest surviving regatta, the Killarney Regatta, which is held annually on the first or second Sunday in July. The six clubs are Commercial RC (Killarney), Flesk Valley RC, Fossa RC, Muckross RC, St. Brendan's RC and Workmen RC. The style of rowing seen at the regatta is traditional, fixed seat rowing in wide, wooden six-person boats. Since the 1980s, a number of the clubs have moved toward coastal type rowing and modern 'slide' or Olympic style rowing.

Muckross Rowing Club is the largest of the clubs, having developed into a full-time 'sliding' club with 32 National Championships (since 1996) at various levels from Junior to Senior. A number of members of the club have also been selected to row for Ireland and have competed at the Home International Regatta, Coupe de la Jeunesse, World Rowing Championships and Olympic Games. Paul Griffin, Sean Casey and Cathal Moynihan members of Muckross Rowing Club, are Olympic and Irish World Championship rowers.

=== Rugby ===
Killarney RFC play in the Munster Junior League. The club's 1st XV won promotion to Division 2 in 2009–10. while the same season the club fielded a 2nd XV for the first time. The club has also a large youth and underage set-up catering for all young enthusiasts from the town and surrounding areas.

=== Car rallying ===
Killarney has also long hosted the Rally of the Lakes, an international motor rally based at Killarney Racecourse that has drawn crowds estimated at up to 100,000 and was said to generate spending of more than €25 million during a single weekend. The event has periodically been associated with public disorder: in April 2000, gardaí in riot gear made several arrests after a crowd of around 500 people threw stones and bottles at officers on New Street, an incident that followed the cancellation of a comparable rally in Galway earlier that year due to similar disturbances. In 2005, up to 50 people were arrested over the bank holiday weekend of that year's rally, mostly for public order offences, while Killarney Chamber of Commerce president Conor Hennigan said the general view among local business people was that the event benefited the town.

=== Golf ===
Killarney Golf & Fishing Club attracts various national competitions such as the Irish Open. The Ross Golf Course is a 9-hole golf course less than one mile from the centre of the town.

=== Other sports ===
Killarney Racecourse is located just outside the town and holds flat and national hunt meetings.

The Ring of Kerry Cycle, a charity cycle around the Ring (175 km) takes place every first Saturday in July. There is also a club in Killarney called Killarney Cycling Club.

St. Paul's Killarney Basketball Club, founded in 1985, has entered both youth and senior teams in tournaments organised by Basketball Ireland. Killarney is also the home of Irish floorball.

== In popular culture and music ==
In 1900 the composer Cyril Rootham wrote his Op.8 "Four Impressions (Killarney)" for solo violin and small orchestra. The work was never published, but Rootham later arranged the work for pianoforte duet (Op.8 No.2, unpublished) and for violin and piano (Op.8.No.3, published in 1902 as "Impressions pour Violon et Piano").

At the beginning of the 20th century, many songs which romanticized Ireland made direct mention of Killarney. Examples included "My Father Was Born In Killarney - Don’t Run Down The Irish" (1910), "Too Ra Loo Ra Loo Ral" (1914) and "For Killarney and you" (1910).

"There's Only the One Killarney" is a song that was written by Irish songwriter Dick Farrelly and recorded by Irish tenor Patrich O'Hagan. Killarney also appears in "How Can You Buy Killarney," written by Kennedy, Steels, Grant and Morrison, and recorded by Joseph Locke, among others. Killarney is also mentioned in "Christmas in Killarney" (written by Redmond, Cavanaugh and Weldon) and "Did Your Mother Come From Ireland?" (written by Kennedy and Carr), both most notably recorded by Bing Crosby. "Some Say the Devil Is Dead" by Derek Warfield contains the line "Some say the devil is dead and buried in Killarney/ More say he rose again and joined the British Army."

Van Morrison references the town in the opening lines of his 1974 song "Fair Play" off of his album Veedon Fleece: "Fair play to you / Killarney's lakes are so blue / And the architecture I'm taking in with my mind / So fine."

Colin O'Sullivan's 2013 novel, Killarney Blues, is set in the town and was awarded the "Prix Mystère de la critique" in 2018.

== Notable people ==
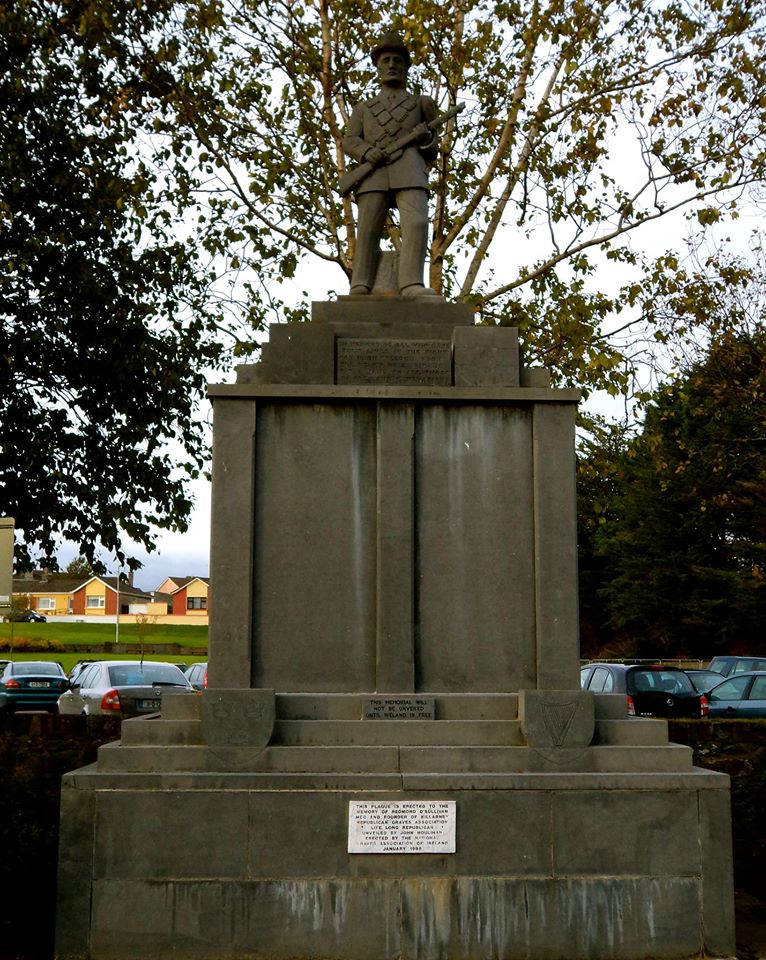
Memorial to members of the 2nd Kerry Brigade of the IRA who died in the Irish War of Independence

- Eóin Brosnan, Gaelic footballer and solicitor
- Jessie Buckley, actress and singer
- Paul Coghlan, former senator
- Colm Cooper, Gaelic footballer
- John J. Crowley, 20th century Catholic priest in California known as the Padre of the Desert
- Edward Eagar, lawyer and convict
- Michael Fassbender, actor
- Thomas Fitton, cricketer and Royal Air Force officer
- Dick Fitzgerald, Kerry Gaelic footballer
- Robert Hilliard, boxer, Irish republican, Church of Ireland minister
- Hugh Kelly, writer
- Seán Kelly, MEP, former President of the GAA and chairman of the Irish Institute of Sport
- Mark Lanegan, American musician and author who lived in Killarney from 2020 until his death in 2022.
- Tadhg Lyne, three times All-Ireland Senior Football Championship winner with the Kerry GAA Gaelic football team
- James McDonogh, first-class cricketer
- Michael McElhatton, soccer player
- Brendan Moloney, soccer player
- Breeda Moynihan-Cronin, former TD
- Michael Moynihan, former TD
- Paul Nagle, rally co-driver
- Peter O'Brien, Gaelic footballer
- Diarmuid O'Carroll, soccer player
- Monsignor Hugh O'Flaherty, Roman Catholic priest who lived in Killarney as a child
- John O'Leary, former TD
- Gillian O'Sullivan, former Olympian racewalker, world record holder and silver medalist at the World Athletics Championships 2003
- John M. O'Sullivan, TD
- Eileen Sheehan, poet

== International relations ==
Killarney is twinned with:

Castiglione di Sicilia, Catania, Sicily, Italy
Pleinfeld, Bavaria, Germany
Concord, North Carolina, United States
Cooper City, Florida, United States
Springfield, Illinois, United States
Myrtle Beach, South Carolina, United States
Scottsdale, Arizona, United States
Kendal, Cumbria, England, United Kingdom
Staffanstorp, Scania, Sweden
Casperia, Rieti, Lazio, Italy

== See also ==
- List of towns and villages in Ireland
- St Brendan's College, Killarney
