= Peter O'Brien (Gaelic footballer) =

Irish Gaelic footballer

Personal information
- Born: County Kerry, Ireland

Sport
- Sport: Gaelic football
- Position: Goalkeeper
Club
- Years: Club
- 1989-2003: Dr. Crokes
Club titles
- Kerry titles: 2
- Munster titles: 2
- All-Ireland Titles: 1
Inter-county
Years	County	Apps (scores)
1995	Kerry	2 (0-00)
Inter-county titles
- Munster titles: 0
- All-Irelands: 0
- All Stars: 0

Peter O'Brien was a Gaelic football goalkeeper from Killarney, County Kerry, Ireland. He played with the Dr. Crokes club and the Kerry intercounty team.

He played with the Kerry senior team for one season in 1995.

After playing underage football, at a senior club level, O'Brien won Kerry Senior Football Championship titles in 1991 and 2000. The 1991 title was the first win since 1914 for Dr. Crokes. O'Brien also won two Munster Senior Club Football Championship titles in 1990 and 1991 and an All-Ireland Senior Club Football Championship in 1992. He now has 3 kids Ross, Lauren, Keelan.

He is credited with giving Colm Cooper his nickname, The Gooch.
