= Killarney Town Hall =

Municipal building in Killarney, County Kerry, Ireland

- Halla an Bhaile Cill Airne
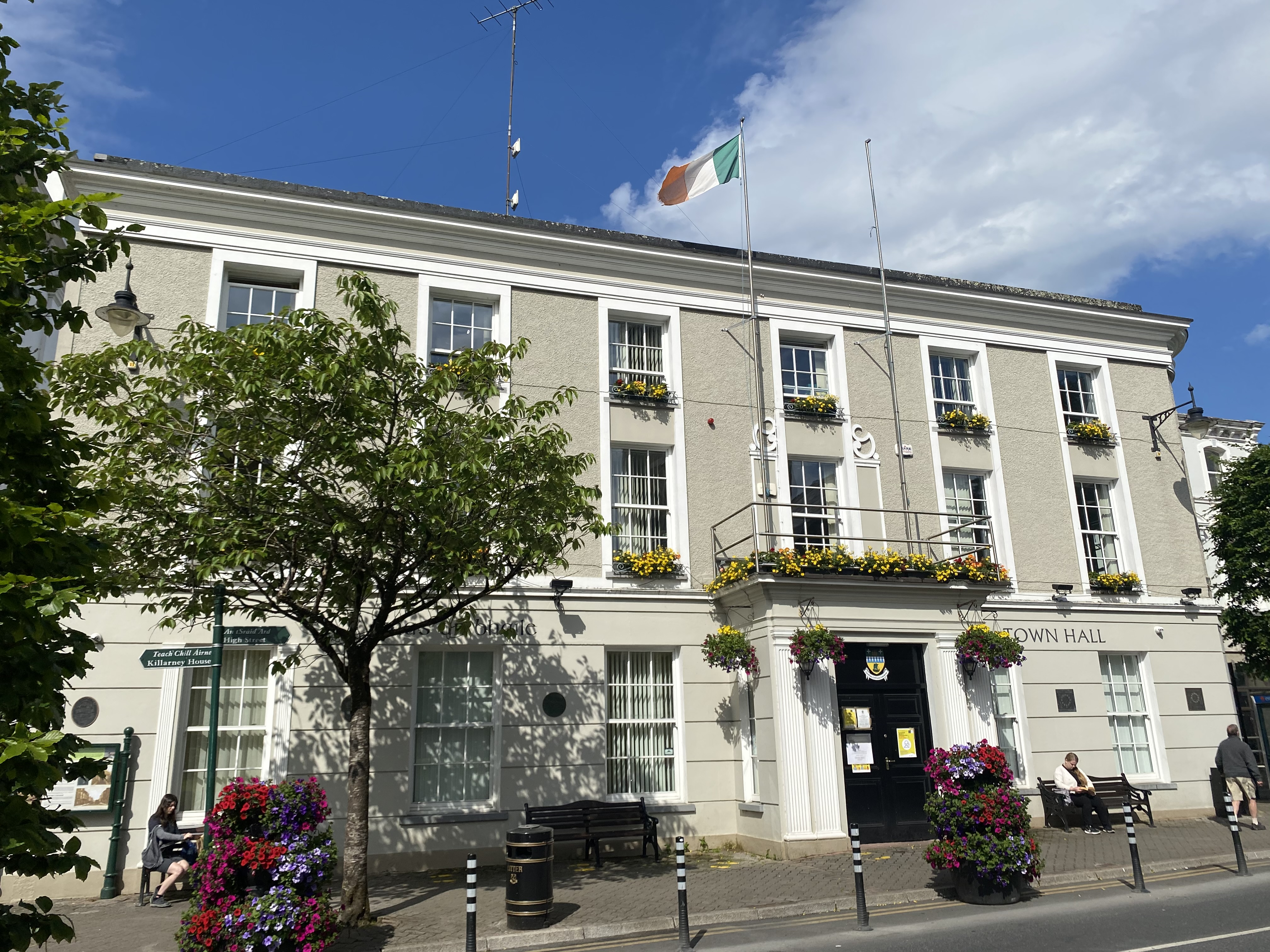
- Killarney Town Hall

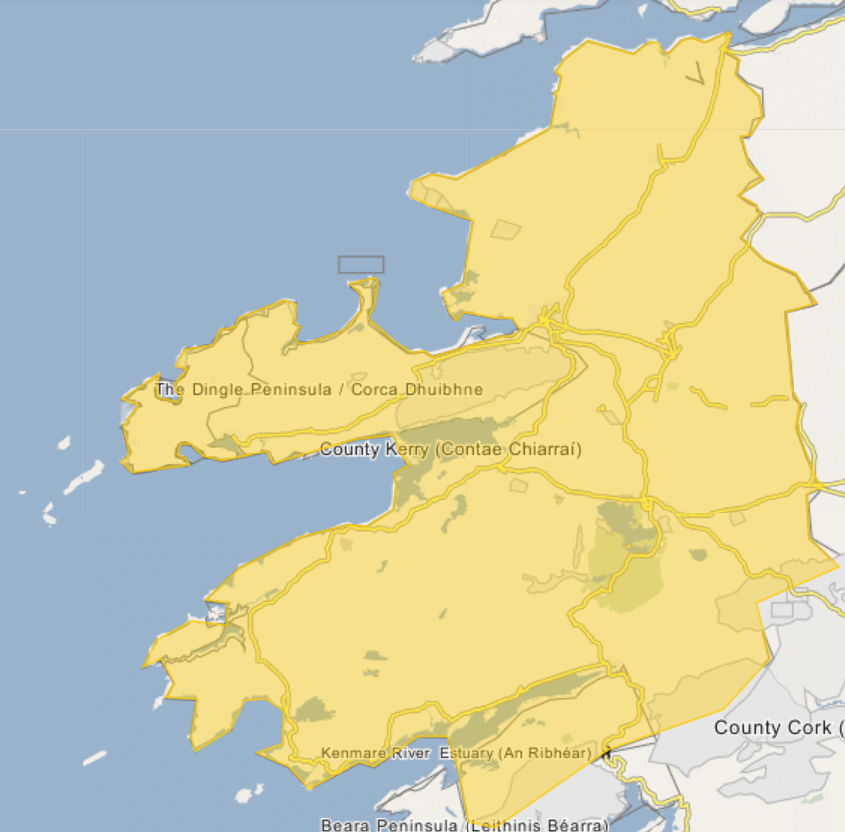
- Location within County Kerry

General information
- Architectural style: Neoclassical style
- Location: Kenmare Place, Killarney, Ireland
- Coordinates: 52.0579°N 9.5089°W
- Completed: c.1930

Killarney Town Hall (Irish: Halla an Bhaile Cill Airne) is a municipal building in Kenmare Place, Killarney, County Kerry, Ireland. The building accommodated the offices of Killarney Town Council until 2014 but is now used by Kerry County Council for the provision of services to local residents.

== History ==
The first municipal building in Killarney was a market hall in Main Street which had become very dilapidated by the mid-19th century and which the town commissioners decided to demolish and replace with a new building.

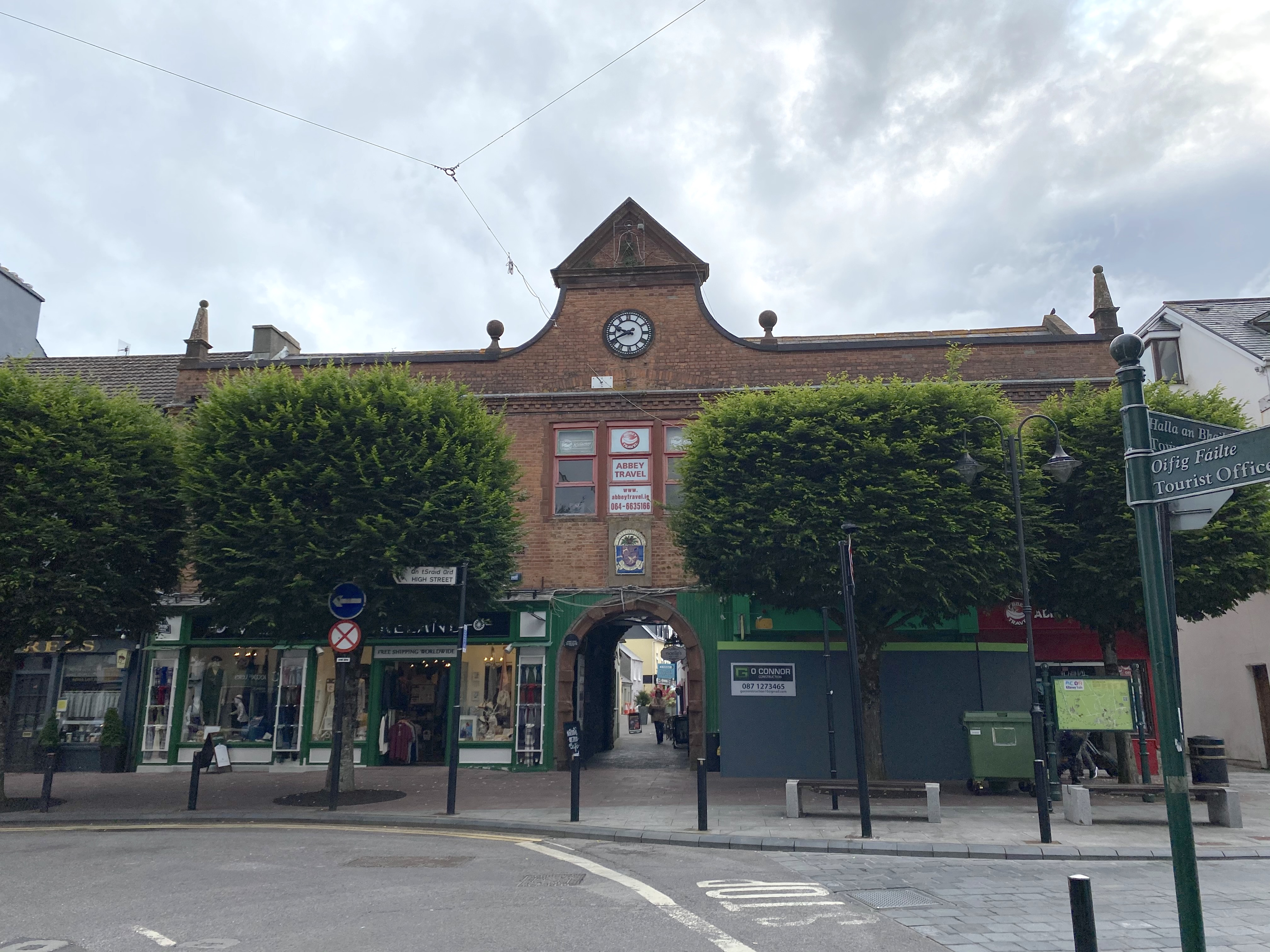
Old Town Hall, Killarney

The second town hall was designed in the Renaissance style, built in red brick with a whitewash finish and was completed in around 1880. The design involved a symmetrical main frontage of five bays facing onto Main Street. The central bay featured a round headed carriageway on the ground floor and a nine-part window on the first floor. The wings were fenestrated by six-part windows in the inner bays and by single windows with cornices in the outer bays. At roof level, there was a modillioned cornice and a parapet, which was broken by a Dutch gable, containing a clock, above the centre bay.

The Prince and Princess of Wales passed the town hall during their visit to Ireland in September 1897. In 1899, the town commissioners were replaced by an urban district council, with the town hall becoming the offices of the new council. The building became an important venue for political meetings. A convention to select a candidate to represent the Irish Parliamentary Party in the 1906 general election was held there in January 1906: John Murphy was eventually selected by the party, and then elected to parliament.

In the 1920s, the urban district council decided to erect a new town hall in Kenmare Place, and the old town hall was made available for commercial development. The third town hall was designed in the neoclassical style, built in brick with a cement render finish and was completed around 1930. The design involved an asymmetrical main frontage of six bays facing onto Kenmare Place. The ground floor was rusticated and featured a porch, formed by two pairs of fluted pilasters supporting an entablature and a flat roof, in the third bay from the right. The other bays on the ground floor and all the bays on the first and second floors were fenestrated by sash windows, but with distinctive architraves which spanned the windows on the two upper floors. The north end of the building was designed in a similar style but with a curved frontage containing bay windows on all three floors. At roof level, there was an entablature and prominent eaves.

The new town hall was used for screening films from June 1940. After construction work started on the new 220-bedroom Killarney Plaza Hotel just to the south of the town hall in Kenmare Place in the late 20th century, cracks started to emerge in the town hall and remedial work became necessary. The building continued to be used as the offices of the urban district council until 2002, and then as the offices of the successor town council. In 2014, the council was dissolved and administration of the town was amalgamated with Kerry County Council in accordance with the Local Government Reform Act 2014. A major programme of renovation works, involving the creation of an enhanced public counter area, for use by local residents, was completed in June 2017.
